= EF1 =

EF1 may refer to:

- EF1 item allocation - a rule for fair allocation of indivisible objects among people with different preferences.
- A tornado intensity rating on the Enhanced Fujita scale.
