= Weakly additive =

In fair division, a topic in economics, a preference relation is weakly additive if the following condition is met:

If A is preferred to B, and C is preferred to D (and the contents of A and C do not overlap) then A together with C is preferable to B together with D.

Every additive utility function is weakly-additive. However, additivity is applicable only to cardinal utility functions, while weak additivity is applicable to ordinal utility functions.

Weak additivity is often a realistic assumption when dividing up goods between claimants, and simplifies the mathematics of certain fair division problems considerably. Some procedures in fair division do not need the value of goods to be additive and only require weak additivity. In particular the adjusted winner procedure only requires weak additivity.

== Cases where weak additivity fails ==
Case where the assumptions might fail would be either

- The value of A and C together is the less than the sum of their values. For instance two versions of the same CD may not be as valuable to a person as the sum of the values of the individual CDs on their own. I.e, A and C are substitute goods.
- The values of B and D together may be more than their individual values added. For instance two matching bookends may be much more valuable than twice the value of an individual bookend. I.e, B and D are complementary goods.

The use of money as compensation can often turn real cases like these into situations where the weak additivity condition is satisfied even if the values are not exactly additive.

The value of a type of goods, e.g. chairs, dependent on having some of those goods already is called the marginal utility.

== See also ==
- Responsive set extension#Responsiveness
