= Single-minded agent =

In computational economics, a single-minded agent is an agent who wants only a very specific combination of items. The valuation function of such an agent assigns a positive value only to a specific set of items, and to all sets that contain it. It assigns a zero value to all other sets. A single-minded agent regards the set of items he wants as purely complementary goods.

Various computational problems related to allocation of items are easier when all the agents are known to be single-minded. For example:

- Revenue-maximizing auctions.
- Multi-item exchange.
- Fair cake-cutting and fair item allocation.
- Combinatorial auctions.
- Envy-free pricing.

== Comparison to other valuation functions ==
As mentioned above, a single-minded agent regards the goods as purely complementary goods

In contrast, an additive agent assigns a positive value to every item, and assigns to every bundle a value that is the sum of the items in contains. An additive agent regards the set of items he wants as purely independent goods.

In contrast, a unit-demand agent wants only a single item, and assigns to every bundle a value that is the maximum value of an item contained in it. A unit-demand agent regards the items as purely substitute goods.
