= Gross substitutes =

The term gross substitutes is used in two slightly different meanings:

1. In microeconomics, two commodities $X$ and $Y$ are called gross substitutes, if $\frac{\Delta \text{demand}(X)}{\Delta \text{price}(Y)} > 0$. I.e., an increase in the price of one commodity causes people to want strictly more of the other commodity, since the commodities can substitute each other (bus and taxi are a common example).
2. In auction theory and competitive equilibrium theory, a valuation function is said to have the gross substitutes (GS) property if for all pairs of commodities: $\frac{\Delta \text{demand}(X)}{\Delta \text{price}(Y)}\geq 0$. I.e., the definition includes both substitute goods and independent goods, and only rules out complementary goods. See Gross substitutes (indivisible items).
