= Utility functions on divisible goods =

This page compares the properties of several typical utility functions of divisible goods. These functions are commonly used as examples in consumer theory.

The functions are ordinal utility functions, which means that their properties are invariant under positive monotone transformation. For example, the Cobb–Douglas function could also be written as: $w_x \log{x} + w_y\log{y}$. Such functions only become interesting when there are two or more goods (with a single good, all monotonically increasing functions are ordinally equivalent).

The utility functions are exemplified for two goods, $x$ and $y$. $p_x$ and $p_y$ are their prices. $w_x$ and $w_y$ are constant positive parameters and $r$ is another constant parameter. $u_y$ is a utility function of a single commodity ($y$). $I$ is the total income (wealth) of the consumer.

Name	Function	Marshallian Demand curve	Indirect utility	Indifference curves	Monotonicity	Convexity	Homothety	Good type	Example
Leontief	$\min\left({x\over w_x},{y\over w_y}\right)$	hyperbolic: $I \over w_x p_x+w_y p_y$	?	L-shapes	Weak	Weak	Yes	Perfect complements	Left and right shoes
Cobb–Douglas	$x^{w_x} y^{w_y}$	hyperbolic: $\frac{w_x}{w_x+w_y} {I \over p_x}$	$I \over p_x^{w_x} p_y^{w_y}$	hyperbolic	Strong	Strong	Yes	Independent	Apples and socks
Linear	${{x\over w_x}+{y\over w_y}}$	"Step function" correspondence: only goods with minimum ${w_i p_i}$ are demanded	?	Straight lines	Strong	Weak	Yes	Perfect substitutes	Potatoes of two different farms
Quasilinear	$x + u_y(y)$	Demand for $y$ is determined by: $u_y'(y) = p_y/p_x$	$v(p) + I$ where v is a function of price only	Parallel curves	Strong, if $u_y$ is increasing	Strong, if $u_y$ is quasiconcave	No	Substitutes, if $u_y$ is quasiconcave	Money ($x$) and another product ($y$)
Maximum	$\left({x\over w_x},{y\over w_y}\right)$	Discontinuous step function: only one good with minimum ${w_i p_i}$ is demanded	?	ר-shapes	Weak	Concave	Yes	Substitutes and interfering	Two simultaneous movies
CES	$\left(\left({x\over w_x}\right)^r + \left({y\over w_y}\right)^r\right)^{1/r}$	See Marshallian demand function#Example	?	Leontief, Cobb–Douglas, Linear and Maximum are special cases when $r=-\infty,0,1,\infty$, respectively.					
Translog	$w_x \ln{x} + w_y \ln{y} + w_{xy} \ln{x} \ln{y}$	?	?	Cobb–Douglas is a special case when $w_{xy}=0$.					
Isoelastic	$x^{w_x}+y^{w_y}$	?	?	?	?	?	?	?	?

== Acknowledgements ==
This page has been greatly improved thanks to comments and answers in Economics StackExchange.

== See also ==
- Utility functions on indivisible goods
