= Demand oracle =

Function in algorithmic game theory

In algorithmic game theory, a branch of both computer science and economics, a demand oracle is a function that, given a price-vector, returns the demand of an agent. It is used by many algorithms related to pricing and optimization in online market. It is usually contrasted with a value oracle, which is a function that, given a set of items, returns the value assigned to them by an agent.

== Demand ==
The demand of an agent is the bundle of items that the agent most prefers, given some fixed prices of the items. As an example, consider a market with three objects and one agent, with the following values and prices.

	Value	Price
Apple	2	5
Banana	4	3
Cherry	6	1

Suppose the agent's utility function is additive (= the value of a bundle is the sum of values of the items in the bundle), and quasilinear (= the utility of a bundle is the value of the bundle minus its price). Then, the demand of the agent, given the prices, is the set {Banana, Cherry}, which gives a utility of (4+6)-(3+1) = 6. Every other set gives the agent a smaller utility. For example, the empty set gives utility 0, while the set of all items gives utility (2+4+6)-(5+3+1)=3.

== Oracle ==
With additive valuations, the demand function is easy to compute - there is no need for an "oracle". However, in general, agents may have combinatorial valuations. This means that, for each combination of items, they may have a different value, which is not necessarily a sum of their values for the individual items. Describing such a function on m items might require up to 2^{m} numbers - a number for each subset. This may be infeasible when m is large. Therefore, many algorithms for markets use two kinds of oracles:

- A value oracle can answer value queries: given a bundle, it returns its value.
- A demand oracle can answer demand queries: given a price-vector, it returns a bundle that maximizes the quasilinear utility (value minus price).

== Applications ==
Some examples of algorithms using demand oracles are:

- Welfare maximization: there are n agents and m items. Each agent is represented by a value-oracle and a demand-oracle. It is required to allocate the items among the agents such that the sum of values is maximized. In general the problem is NP-hard, but approximations are known for special cases, such as submodular valuations (this is called the "submodular welfare problem"). Some algorithms use only a value oracle; other algorithms use also a demand oracle.
- Envy-free pricing: there are n agents and m items. Each agent is represented by a value-oracle and a demand-oracle. It is required to find a price-vector and an allocation of the items, such that no agent is envious, and subject to that, the seller's revenue is maximized.
- Market equilibrium computation.
- Learning strong-substitutes demand.

== See also ==
- Oracle machine
- Demand curve
- Robertson-Webb query model - a similar query model in the domain of cake-cutting.
