= Budget-additive valuation =

Utility function used in economic equations

In economics, a budget-additive valuation is a kind of a utility function. It corresponds to a person that, when given a set of items, evaluates them in the following way:

- For each item j, there is a fixed value v_{j}.
- There is also a fixed budget B.
- The value of the set of items is the minimum between B and the sum of values of items in the set.

Budget-additive valuations are useful in the research of online advertising, combinatorial auctions, resource allocation, and market equilibrium.

== Relation to other kinds of valuations ==
Every additive valuation is a special case of a budget-additive valuation, in which the budget is infinite. Every budget-additive valuation is a submodular valuation.

== See also ==
- Utility functions on indivisible goods
