= Calcutta auction =

Form of bet

A Calcutta auction is an open auction held in conjunction with a golf tournament, horse race or similar contest with multiple entrants. It is popular in backgammon, the Melbourne Cup and college basketball pools during March Madness. A Calcutta auction is a sequential auction in which the bidding for each contestant begins in random order, with bids placed on only one contestant at any time. Accordingly, participants (originally in Calcutta, India, from where the technique was first recorded by the colonial British) bid among themselves to "buy" each of the contestants, with each contestant assigned to the highest bidder. The contestant will then pay to the owner a predetermined proportion of the pool depending on how it performs in the tournament.

While variations in payoff schedules exist, in the NCAA basketball tournament (64 teams, single elimination, maximum six wins) the payoffs could be:

Wins	Payout
1	0.25%
2	2%
3	4%
4	8%
5	16%
6	32%

The precise rules of a Calcutta can vary from place to place. An important component of Calcutta auctions is the determination of an appropriate wager for each contestant, as the payoff will directly hinge on the size of the pot and thereby the size of the bids.

Calcutta auctions are similar to parimutuel betting in that the winnings are awarded from the total pool of bets, but differ in that only one player can bet on any one contestant.

A Calcutta golf tournament is a major plot point of the 1967 film Banning.
