= Superadditive set function =

In mathematics, a superadditive set function is a set function whose value when applied to the union of two disjoint sets is greater than or equal to the sum of values of the function applied to each of the sets separately. This definition is analogous to the notion of superadditivity for real-valued functions. It is contrasted to subadditive set function.

== Definition ==
Let $\Omega$ be a set and $f \colon 2^{\Omega} \rightarrow \mathbb{R}$ be a set function, where $2^\Omega$ denotes the power set of $\Omega$. The function f is superadditive if for any pair of disjoint subsets $S,T$ of $\Omega$, we have $f(S) + f(T) \leq f(S \cup T)$.

== See also ==
- Utility functions on indivisible goods
