= Additive utility =

Concept in economics

In economics, additive utility is a cardinal utility function with the sigma additivity property.

Additive utility
$A$	$u(A)$
$\emptyset$	0
apple	5
hat	7
apple and hat	12

Additivity (also called linearity or modularity) means that "the whole is equal to the sum of its parts." That is, the utility of a set of items is the sum of the utilities of each item separately. Let $S$ be a finite set of items. A cardinal utility function $u:2^S\to\R$, where $2^S$ is the power set of $S$, is additive if for any $A, B\subseteq S$,

$$u(A)+u(B)=u(A\cup B)+u(A\cap B).$$

It follows that for any $A\subseteq S$,

$$u(A)=u(\emptyset)+\sum_{x\in A}\big(u(\{x\})-u(\emptyset)\big).$$

An additive utility function is characteristic of independent goods. For example, an apple and a hat are considered independent: the utility a person receives from having an apple is the same whether or not he has a hat, and vice versa. A typical utility function for this case is given at the right.

== Notes ==
- As mentioned above, additivity is a property of cardinal utility functions. An analogous property of ordinal utility functions is weakly additive.
- A utility function is additive if and only if it is both submodular and supermodular.

== See also ==
- Utility functions on indivisible goods
- Independent goods
- Submodular set function
- Supermodular set function
