= Unit demand =

In economics, a unit demand agent is an agent who wants to buy a single item, which may be of one of different types. A typical example is a buyer who needs a new car. There are many different types of cars, but usually a buyer will choose only one of them, based on the quality and the price.

If there are m different item-types, then a unit-demand valuation function is typically represented by m values $v_1,\dots,v_m$, with $v_j$ representing the subjective value that the agent derives from item $j$. If the agent receives a set $A$ of items, then his total utility is given by:

$$u(A)=\max_{j\in A}v_j$$

since he enjoys the most valuable item from $A$ and ignores the rest.

Therefore, if the price of item $j$ is $p_j$, then a unit-demand buyer will typically want to buy a single item – the item $j$ for which the net utility $v_j - p_j$ is maximized.

== Ordinal and cardinal definitions ==
A unit-demand valuation is formally defined by:

- For a preference relation: for every set $B$ there is a subset $A\subseteq B$ with cardinality $|A|=1$, such that $A \succeq B$.
- For a utility function: For every set $A$:

$$u(A)=\max_{x\in A}u(\{x\})$$

== Connection to other classes of utility functions ==
A unit-demand function is an extreme case of a submodular set function.

It is characteristic of items that are pure substitute goods.

== See also ==
- Utility functions on indivisible goods
- Matching (graph theory)
