= Independent goods =

Goods that are neither complements nor substitutes

Two goods that are independent have a zero cross price elasticity of demand : as the price of good Y rises, the demand for good X stays constant

Independent goods are goods that have a zero cross elasticity of demand. Changes in the price of one good will have no effect on the demand for an independent good. Thus independent goods are neither complements nor substitutes.

For example, a person's demand for nails is usually independent of his or her demand for bread, since they are two unrelated types of goods. Note that this concept is subjective and depends on the consumer's personal utility function.

A Cobb-Douglas utility function implies that goods are independent. For goods in quantities X_{1} and X_{2}, prices p_{1} and p_{2}, income m, and utility function parameter a, the utility function

$$u(X_1, X_2) = X_1^a X_2^{(1-a)},$$

when optimized subject to the budget constraint that expenditure on the two goods cannot exceed income, gives rise to this demand function for good 1: $X_1= am/p_1,$ which does not depend on p_{2}.

== See also ==
- Consumer theory
- Good (economics and accounting)
