= Storable votes =

Multi-issue voting rule

Storable voting is a multi-issue voting rule intended to promote minority rights relative to a simple majority system.

Storable voting was the first multi-issue voting rule to be proposed, and is arguably the simplest. Despite this, it is easily gamed by strategic voting, because the ideal strategy for each voter is to pile all their votes into the one contest they deem most important. This contrasts with quadratic voting, which is slightly more complex but incentive-compatible.

== Voting with storable votes ==
=== Context ===
Storable Votes apply to a context where several binary issues (Yes/No questions) are to be decided.

Imagine a committee, for example the board of a central bank, that every month needs to vote on an up-or-down decision, say changing the interest rate or not. Each month, the decision is taken according to the majority of votes cast.

Instead of having one vote for each monthly meeting, suppose that each committee member is granted 12 votes at the beginning of the year and can cast as many of these votes as s/he wishes at any one meeting.

Clearly if a committee member casts more than one vote at one meeting, then that member will not have a vote to cast at one or more of the following meetings. Alternatively, if a member abstains, he or she will have more votes for the future. The possibility to "store votes" for future use gives the name to the mechanism.

=== Implementation ===
In general, the multiple decisions can be either simultaneous or take place over time. The exact mechanism most studied so far grants each voter a regular vote for each decision, that cannot be stored, and a stock of bonus votes that can instead be spent freely over the different decisions. In the simplest case, the bonus vote could be a single vote.

Then, every voter would have the opportunity to cast two votes on a single issue (one regular vote and one bonus vote), and one vote on the others (one regular vote).

=== Comparison with cumulative voting ===
As with cumulative voting, Storable Votes allow voters to redistribute votes among issues as they see fit. However, cumulative voting applies to a single multi-candidate election, whereas Storable Votes apply to multiple elections, each between two alternatives only.

For example, cumulative voting can be used to elect a board of five members, out of a field of ten candidates: each voter is granted five votes and is free to distribute them on as many as five candidates or as few as a single one.

Storable Votes apply instead to five different decisions, each with two choices only. For example, five proposals must be voted up or down, or five seats on a board must be filled, and each seat is contended by two candidates: voters are granted five bonus votes that can be spread over the five elections, or concentrated on as few elections as the voter sees fit.

Note that the competition among candidates is very different: in the single election using cumulative voting, each candidate competes with all other nine; in the multiple elections using Storable Votes, each candidate competes with one other candidate only. This means that the functioning of the voting rule, the "game" that represents voters’ strategic behavior, is very different.

However, it is clear that the goals of the two systems are similar: by concentrating votes on one candidate or one election, they allow voters to represent the intensity of their preferences. And by allowing the expression of the intensity of preferences, they increase the representation of minority interests, relative to simple majority rule.

== Theoretical predictions ==
=== Objective and mechanism ===
The objective of Storable Voting is to offer a way for voters to represent not only the direction of their preference (Yes/No), but also how relatively intensely they feel about different issues. Robert Dahl (1956) asked the question:

"What if a minority prefers an alternative much more passionately than the majority prefers a contrary alternative? Does the majority principle still make sense?"

With Storable Votes, a voter who does not feel differently about the issues at stake will spread his/her votes over all of them, and the voting rule will be identical to simple majority rule. But a voter with an intense view on a specific issue will be able to target this issue by casting some bonus votes. Because the decision is then taken according to the majority of votes cast, as opposed to the majority of voters, the minority can win. But the minority wins only if a sufficient number of minority voters feel strongly about the issue, while the majority does not. Thus the minority can win only when its preferences are intense and the majority's preferences are not, exactly as Dahl wanted. Fairness (the occasional representation of minority interests) and efficiency (the weight given in decision-making to the intensity of preferences) go together.

Minority representation is achieved while treating all voters identically (all have the same number of bonus votes), and without supermajority requirements or vetoes that hamper decision-making.

An important property of Storable votes is that they function through the private incentives of the voters: there is no external agent who needs to gauge and reward intensity of preferences. Voters themselves choose how to use the bonus votes and are induced by the mechanism to express the relative intensity of their preferences truthfully. The voting rule works well regardless of the realizations of individual preferences. If voters feel equally about all issues, or if the intensity of preferences of minority and majority members are perfectly correlated (everybody agrees on what the important issues are), then Storable Votes are identical to simple majority rule. It is only when the minority feels relatively more strongly about one issue than the majority does that Storable Votes come to differ from majority rule.

=== Model and questions ===
The mechanism has been studied in a succession of papers by Alessandra Casella, who introduced the concept in a paper published in 2005, and several co-authors. Rafael Hortala-Vallve introduced a similar concept, which he called "Qualitative Voting", in a paper written later but independently. The theoretical studies are based on models where a set of voters have different preferences over issues, characterized by some random variable v^{i}_{t} which is the value that voter i gives to issue t. There are then two main questions. First, on what issues does a voter cast her extra-votes? Second, given those optimal strategies, does the mechanism provide eventually a better outcome than majority voting?

=== General properties ===
Following those questions, Storable Voting, has a number of original properties when compared to majority voting. As mentioned above:

- It treats every voter identically, by construction;
- It encourages voters to reveal their intensity of preferences truthfully: for instance, with one bonus vote, a voter always casts two votes on the issue she feels most strongly about. This is not trivial, since casting a bonus vote on an issue means a stronger impact on the outcome for this issue, but a weaker one on all the other issues;
- It is possible for a minority to win some of the time. For instance with seven voters and a single bonus vote, a minority of three can win the issue it considers most important, and on which each minority voter casts two votes, as long as not more than one of the majority members also considers it her highest priority. (In this case, the minority casts 2x3=6 votes and the majority casts 1x3+2x1=5 votes). Thus Storable Votes result in minority victories only when the minority "cares intensely" about the outcome of a decision while the majority does not, and thus when the cost of the defeat for the majority is small;
- The larger the difference in size between the two groups, the larger the discrepancy in the use of bonus votes must be for the minority to prevail;
- When considering the expected utility before the voting takes place (The sum of v^{i}_{t} weighted by the probability that one's preferred outcome passes at t ), Storable Votes is generally welfare superior to majority voting.

== Experimental results ==
Alessandra Casella, Tom Palfrey, Andrew Gelman, and other co-authors realized several laboratory experiments and one quasi-experiment in the field to test the theoretical predictions of Storable Votes models.

The recurring and surprising result is that while experimental subjects have clear difficulties with the subtle strategic calculations that the theory takes into account, the total payoffs that the experimental subjects take home from the experiments are close to identical to the theoretical predictions. The data suggest a plausible explanation: while the subjects use rules of thumb, as opposed to optimal strategies, in deciding the exact number of votes to cast over each decision, they consistently cast more votes when their intensity of preferences is higher. This intuitive behavior is sufficient to increase the frequency with which they win decisions they care more about, in exchange for losing decisions that matter to them less. The result is that voting outcomes and thus payoffs mimic closely the predictions of the theory. And as in the theory, Storable Votes tend to dominate Majority Voting in the experiments: the total payoffs that subjects bring home tend to be higher. The performance of Storable Votes appears robust to the strategic errors that are observed in the laboratory.

The laboratory experiments reveal a number of regularities:

- When voters are ex ante symmetric (equally likely to be part of the majority or the minority), Storable Votes lead to higher aggregate payoffs than Majority Voting unless the number of voters is small and odd and the number of decisions is small.
- If the composition of the minority group remains fixed over different decisions (a systematic minority), Storable Votes allow the minority to win with non-negligible frequency, although less frequently than utilitarian efficiency would recommend. The gains to the minority occur with little costs to the majority, again as the theory predicts. In fact, if the intensity of preferences is strongly correlated within each groups, so that members of a group agree on the importance assigned to the different decisions, then minority victories have a positive impact on total payoffs: although the majority loses, it loses when it cares little enough about the decision that the gains to the minority more than compensate for its losses.
- In a setting of a "polarized society" where issue-by-issue majority rule would give no power at all to the minority, when voting simultaneously on the different issues, the minority voters manage to concentrate their votes in such a way that they win with some frequency.
- Granting one of the players some limited agenda power does not change the results. In experiments where one subject choose the order in which the different proposals were voted upon, the comparison between Storable Votes and Majority Voting remained unchanged.

In a field study, Casella and her co-authors tried to assess the potential effect of introducing Storable Votes in actual elections. In the spring of 2006, they attached a short survey to students' election ballots in two different schools at Columbia University, asking students to rank the importance assigned to all binary contests on the ballot, and to indicate where they would have cast an additional bonus vote, had one been available. An identifier connected responses and actual voting choices, allowing the authors to construct distributions of intensities and to propose welfare measures of the electoral outcomes, both without and with the bonus vote. Bootstrapping techniques provided estimates of the bonus vote's probable impact. Because the bonus vote choices indicated by the survey respondents were hypothetical only, as a robustness check, the authors analyzed the bootstrap samples relying not only on the survey responses but also on three alternative plausible rules for casting the bonus vote. For each of the four cases, they estimated three measures:

- The frequency with which the bonus vote allows the minority to win at least one election in each set;
- The difference in aggregate welfare, comparing the hypothetical outcome using bonus votes to simple majority voting;
- The impact of the bonus vote on ex post inequality.

The authors conclude that the bonus vote would have worked well. When minority preferences were particularly intense, the minority would have won at least one of the contests with 15% to 30% probability; ex post inequality would have fallen, and yet in the presence of minority victories, aggregate welfare would have increased with 85% to 95% percent probability. When majority and minority preferences were equally intense, the effect of the bonus vote would have been smaller and more variable, but on balance still positive.

== See also ==
- Perpetual voting – a more automated way to ensure minority rights in multiple-issue voting.
