= Ordered weighted averaging =

In applied mathematics, specifically in fuzzy logic, the ordered weighted averaging (OWA) operators provide a parameterized class of mean type aggregation operators. They were introduced by Ronald R. Yager. Many notable mean operators such as the max, arithmetic average, median and min, are members of this class. They have been widely used in computational intelligence because of their ability to model linguistically expressed aggregation instructions.

== Definition ==
An OWA operator of dimension $\ n$ is a mapping $F: \mathbb{R}^n \rightarrow \mathbb{R}$ that has an associated collection of weights $\ W = [w_1, \ldots, w_n]$ lying in the unit interval and summing to one and with

$$F(a_1, \ldots , a_n) =  \sum_{j=1}^n  w_j b_j$$

where $b_j$ is the j^{th} largest of the $a_i$.

By choosing different W one can implement different aggregation operators. The OWA operator is a non-linear operator as a result of the process of determining the b_{j}.

== Notable OWA operators ==
$\ F(a_1, \ldots, a_n) = \max(a_1, \ldots, a_n)$ if $\ w_1 = 1$ and $\ w_j = 0$ for $j \ne 1$

$\ F(a_1, \ldots, a_n) = \min(a_1, \ldots, a_n)$ if $\ w_n = 1$ and $\ w_j = 0$ for $j \ne n$
$\ F(a_1, \ldots, a_n) = \mathrm{average}(a_1, \ldots, a_n)$ if $\ w_j = \frac{1}{n}$ for all $j \in [1, n]$

== Properties ==
The OWA operator is a mean operator. It is bounded, monotonic, symmetric, and idempotent, as defined below.

Bounded	$\min(a_1, \ldots, a_n) \le F(a_1, \ldots, a_n) \le \max(a_1, \ldots, a_n)$
Monotonic	$F(a_1, \ldots, a_n) \ge F(g_1, \ldots, g_n)$ if $a_i \ge g_i$ for $\ i = 1,2,\ldots,n$
Symmetric	$F(a_1, \ldots, a_n) = F(a_\boldsymbol{\pi(1)}, \ldots, a_\boldsymbol{\pi(n)})$ if $\boldsymbol{\pi}$ is a permutation map
Idempotent	$\ F(a_1, \ldots, a_n) = a$ if all $\ a_i = a$

== Characterizing features ==
Two features have been used to characterize the OWA operators. The first is the attitudinal character, also called orness. This is defined as

$$A-C(W)= \frac{1}{n-1} \sum_{j=1}^n (n - j) w_j.$$

It is known that $A-C(W) \in [0, 1]$.

In addition A − C(max) = 1, A − C(ave) = A − C(med) = 0.5 and A − C(min) = 0. Thus the A − C goes from 1 to 0 as we go from Max to Min aggregation. The attitudinal character characterizes the similarity of aggregation to OR operation(OR is defined as the Max).

The second feature is the dispersion. This defined as

$$H(W) = -\sum_{j=1}^n w_j \ln (w_j).$$

An alternative definition is $E(W) = \sum_{j=1}^n w_j^2 .$ The dispersion characterizes how uniformly the arguments are being used.

== Type-1 OWA aggregation operators ==
The above Yager's OWA operators are used to aggregate the crisp values. Can we aggregate fuzzy sets in the OWA mechanism? The Type-1 OWA operators have been proposed for this purpose. So the type-1 OWA operators provides us with a new technique for directly aggregating uncertain information with uncertain weights via OWA mechanism in soft decision making and data mining, where these uncertain objects are modelled by fuzzy sets.

The type-1 OWA operator is defined according to the alpha-cuts of fuzzy sets as follows:

Given the n linguistic weights $\left\{ {W^i} \right\}_{i =1}^n$ in the form of fuzzy sets defined on the domain of discourse $U = [0,\;\;1]$, then for each $\alpha \in [0,\;1]$, an $\alpha$-level type-1 OWA operator with $\alpha$-level sets $\left\{ {W_\alpha ^i } \right\}_{i = 1}^n$ to aggregate the $\alpha$-cuts of fuzzy sets $\left\{ {A^i} \right\}_{i =1}^n$ is given as

$$\Phi_\alpha \left( {A_\alpha ^1 , \ldots ,A_\alpha ^n } \right) =\left\{ {\frac{\sum\limits_{i = 1}^n {w_i a_{\sigma (i)} } }{\sum\limits_{i = 1}^n {w_i } }\left| {w_i \in W_\alpha ^i ,\;a_i } \right. \in A_\alpha ^i ,\;i = 1, \ldots ,n} \right\}$$

where $W_\alpha ^i= \{w| \mu_{W_i }(w) \geq \alpha \}, A_\alpha ^i=\{ x| \mu _{A_i }(x)\geq \alpha \}$, and $\sigma :\{\;1, \ldots ,n\;\} \to \{\;1, \ldots ,n\;\}$ is a permutation function such that $a_{\sigma (i)} \ge a_{\sigma (i + 1)} ,\;\forall \;i = 1, \ldots ,n - 1$, i.e., $a_{\sigma (i)}$ is the $i$th largest element in the set $\left\{ {a_1 , \ldots ,a_n } \right\}$.

The computation of the type-1 OWA output is implemented by computing the left end-points and right end-points of the intervals $\Phi _\alpha \left( {A_\alpha ^1 , \ldots ,A_\alpha ^n } \right)$: $\Phi _\alpha \left( {A_\alpha ^1 , \ldots ,A_\alpha ^n } \right)_{-}$ and $\Phi _\alpha \left( {A_\alpha ^1 , \ldots ,A_\alpha ^n } \right)_ {+},$ where $A_\alpha ^i=[A_{\alpha-}^i, A_{\alpha+}^i], W_\alpha ^i=[W_{\alpha-}^i, W_{\alpha+}^i]$. Then membership function of resulting aggregation fuzzy set is:

$$\mu _{G} (x) = \mathop \vee _{\alpha :x \in \Phi _\alpha \left( {A_\alpha ^1 , \cdots
,A_\alpha ^n } \right)_\alpha } \alpha$$

For the left end-points, we need to solve the following programming problem:

$$\Phi _\alpha \left( {A_\alpha ^1 , \cdots ,A_\alpha ^n } \right)_{-} = \min\limits_{\begin{array}{l} W_{\alpha - }^i \le w_i \le W_{\alpha + }^i A_{\alpha - }^i \le a_i \le A_{\alpha + }^i  \end{array}} \sum\limits_{i = 1}^n {w_i a_{\sigma (i)} / \sum\limits_{i = 1}^n {w_i } }$$

while for the right end-points, we need to solve the following programming problem:

$$\Phi _\alpha \left( {A_\alpha ^1 , \cdots , A_\alpha ^n } \right)_{+} = \max\limits_{\begin{array}{l} W_{\alpha - }^i \le w_i \le W_{\alpha + }^i  A_{\alpha - }^i \le a_i \le A_{\alpha + }^i  \end{array}} \sum\limits_{i = 1}^n {w_i a_{\sigma (i)} / \sum\limits_{i =
1}^n {w_i } }$$

Zhou et al. presented a fast method to solve two programming problem so that the type-1 OWA aggregation operation can be performed efficiently.

== OWA for committee voting ==
Amanatidis, Barrot, Lang, Markakis and Ries present voting rules for multi-issue voting, based on OWA and the Hamming distance. Barrot, Lang and Yokoo study the manipulability of these rules.
