= Issue voting =

Voter behaviour

The term issue voting describes when voters cast their vote in elections based on political issues. In the context of an election, issues include "any questions of public policy which have been or are a matter of controversy and are sources of disagreement between political parties." According to the theory of issue voting, voters compare the candidates' respective principles against their own or rank the candidates' perceived competence on an issue in order to decide for whom to vote.

== Causes ==
A voter does not need to have an in-depth understanding of every issue and knowledge of how a candidate stands on every issue, but rather a sense of which candidate they agree with the most. Voters use many different tactics to rationalize their view on a particular issue. Some people look at what has happened in the past and predict how they think a particular issue will affect them in the future.

Issue voting is often contrasted with party voting. A 2010 University of California, Davis study found that voters switch between issue voting and party voting depending on how much information is available to them about a given candidate. Low-information elections, such as those for congressional candidates, would thus be determined by party voting, whereas presidential elections, which tend to give voters much more information about each candidate, have the potential to be issue-driven.

Voters typically choose a political party to affiliate with in one of two ways. The voter will create an opinion of an issue without consulting what a political party thinks about it, then choose the political party that best fits the opinion they already have, or the voter will study the opinions of the different parties and decide which party he or she agrees with the most.

A voter's understanding of parties' principles is strengthened and developed over time as a person gains experience with more political events. In order for an issue to create the foundation for party choice, a voter must first be concerned about a particular issue and have some knowledge about that issue.

In order for a person to be an issue voter, they must be able to recognize that there is more than one opinion about a particular issue, have formed a solid opinion about it and be able to relate that to a specific political party. According to Campbell, only 40 to 60 percent of the informed population even perceives party differences, and can thus partake in party voting. This would suggest that it is common for individuals to develop opinions of issues without the aid of a political party.

== History of issue voting ==
Prior to The People's Choice study in 1944, it was assumed by political scientists that voting was based solely on issues. However, this study found little evidence of issue voting in the United States presidential election of 1940. Rather, the researchers found that issues reinforced political party loyalties. Research stemming from the study concluded that voters' motivations could be broken down into three categories: party identification, candidate orientation, and issue orientation. The American Voter in 1960 determined that party identification was the primary force, which in turn strongly influenced the other two categories. These three factors make up the Michigan School's approach to modeling voting behavior.

Some of the earliest research on issue voting done in 1960 found that voters often did not have enough information to link specific issues to individual candidates. Converse, in 1964, also concluded that voters did not have a sophisticated enough understanding of issues to be able to link them to candidates. In 1966, Key was one of the first people to conclude that voters are able to connect issues to certain candidates and cast their vote based on that information. Despite the growing knowledge of the field, reliable evidence didn't begin to appear until the 1970s. American Political Science Review published a symposium that hypothesized that there was a rise in issue voting in the 1960s. Nie and Anderson published an analysis of correlations with issue orientations in 1974 that attempted to revise the Michigan School's theory of the public's political belief systems' inherent limitations. In 1979, Nie et al. in The Changing American Voter attempted to explain the rise in issue voting through the fall in party voting. This decline of party voting, they claimed, came about because the proportion of the electorate with no party affiliation had fallen, and because the proportion of voters who cast votes for candidates from other parties had risen.

=== Rise in issue voting ===
In recent years, the United States has seen a rise in issue voting. This can be attributed to the increased polarization in the last century between the Democratic Party and the Republican Party. Both of these parties have become more extreme in their issue viewpoints. This has alienated moderates from their parties. Since a large portion of American voters are moderates, an increase has been seen in the number people who choose to affiliate as Independent. Identifying as an independent allows voters to avoid the constraints of a polarized political party. An independent voter can hand-pick a candidate based upon their positions on various issues rather than on their political party.

Catholics face the "issue voting vs. party voting" dilemma. Many Catholics support the pro-life stance which is backed by Republicans, but strongly oppose the death penalty, which the Republican Party also supports. Extreme party polarization might cause Catholic voters to feel uncomfortable about both Republican and Democratic presidential candidates.

Voting advice applications can contribute to and impact issue voting.

Members of labor unions strongly identify with the Democratic Party's advocacy for workers' rights, but unions also tend to not support gay rights, a stance which more closely aligns with Republican views.

In Europe, issue voting has been used to explain the growth in electoral support for radical right, radical left, and green parties.

== Complications regarding issue voting ==
Many factors can complicate issue voting. First, issues are not always dichotomous; there are often many stances one could take. Voters often must settle for the candidate whose stances are closest to their own. This can prove difficult when two or more candidates have similar opinions, or when candidates have positions that are equally far from a voter's. An example of an issue which might be difficult to issue vote on is education spending. A voter may have a drastically different opinion from the available candidates on how much money should be spent on schools; this could lead the individual to vote based on party affiliation instead.

A second complexity is that, oftentimes, problems do not line up on linear bases. That is, some issues may make it hard to even determine the candidate with the closest position. For example, in the 1980 US presidential election the growing threat of Communism in the Eastern Hemisphere was a salient issue for voters. There were many proposed solutions to this problem; Ronald Reagan endorsed military intimidation through increased spending and innovation (the Reagan Doctrine), Jimmy Carter proposed diplomatic efforts to keep peace, and the independent John Anderson advocated a return to the containment strategy. None of these answers are mutually exclusive, and they cannot be linearly plotted. The voter would instead have to choose the candidate whose opinion represented the closest mix of possible solutions to their own.

A third problem that can complicate issue voting is if there are multiple issues that are equally salient to the voter. A candidate may have a similar position to a given voter on one issue, but may take a considerably different stance on another. An example of this occurred in the 2008 US presidential election. During this election, two issues dominating attention were the economy and the wars in Afghanistan and Iraq. Many viewed these issues as equally salient, and had a hard time picking one issue to vote on. These three complexities in issue voting have provided problems in using this tactic to choosing candidates.

A fourth problem is that voters may be unsophisticated and lack the knowledge necessary to vote based on issues. Political scientist Larry Bartels has argued that voters are generally uninformed and that their actual vote choices do not reflect the vote choices that a fully informed voter would make. He concludes that since voters lack full information, they cannot truly be issue voters.

== Models of issue voting ==
While scholars employ many models to study voting habits, there are three primary models used in statistical studies of issue voting: the linear position model, the spatial model and the salience model. Each model takes a different approach to issue voting into account.

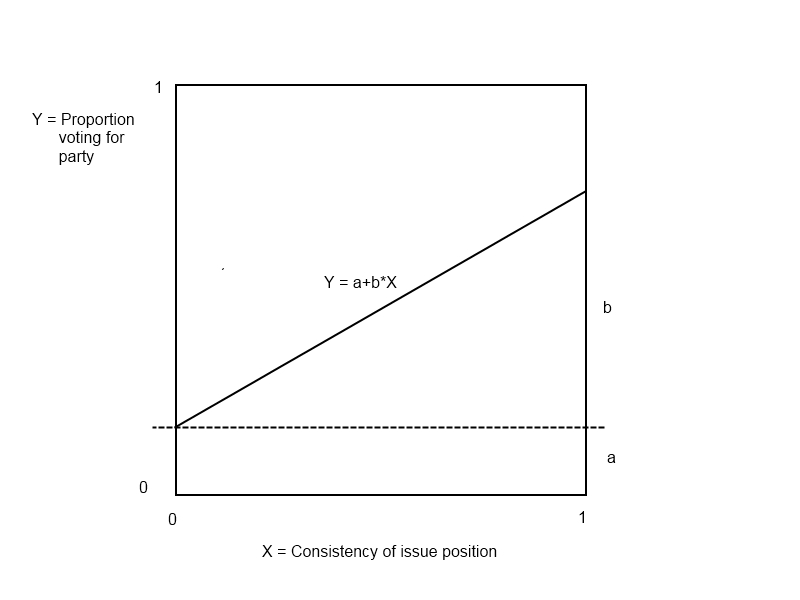
Linear Model of Issue Voting

- The Linear Position Model attempts to predict how strongly an individual will issue vote in an election. The model suggests that the more a voter and candidate agree on a particular issue, the better chance the candidate has of receiving the individual's vote. In this model, a graph is used to display the relationship between the number of people voting for the party and the consistency of the issue position. The equation “Y = a + bX” is used, where the variable “a” represents the minimal number of people voting for the party, “b” is a variable used to ensure that there is a positive gradient, "X" represents the consistency of the party's issue position, and Y represents the number of people who vote for the party.
- The Spatial Model attempts to show the perceptions and decisions of voters when issue voting strategies are used in elections. This model assumes that if someone's issue preferences are placed on a hypothetical spatial field along with all possible candidates’ policy positions, the individual will vote for the candidate whose political stances are closest to their own. Other models that follow the idea of “closeness” are called proximity models.
- The Salience Model asserts that the two major parties in the United States are associated with certain goals or views on an issue, and that the voter's decision in selecting a candidate depends on the actual salience of the issue to the voter. This model is important when considering issue voting because it utilizes election agenda data to predict election outcome. A simple view of this model can be summarized with the equation:

Vote=a(Saliency of the party's issues)+b(Saliency of the party's issues)

where "a"=Party 1, and "b"=Party 2. The more important the issue becomes, the more a voter favors a particular candidate or party on the issue.

== See also ==
- Voting system
- Experimental political science
- Politics of the United States
- Single-issue politics
