= Rebecca Morton =

American academic and political scientist (1954–2020)

Rebecca Morton (10 August 1954 – 26 September 2020) was an American political scientist. She was Professor of Political Science at New York University New York and New York University Abu Dhabi.

== Education ==
Morton earned a BA in social sciences in 1976 and a Master of Public Administration at Louisiana State University in 1977, and a PhD in economics from Tulane University in 1984.

== Career ==
Morton held positions as professor in multiple universities. She started as visiting assistant professor in the College of Business Administration at Tulane University 1983-1984, followed by a position as assistant professor in the Department of Economics and Finance 1984–1985 at the University of New Orleans. She worked in the Department of Economics and Finance at Nicholls State University from 1985 to 1991, becoming tenured as associate professor in 1990. In 1991 Morton moved officially into political science as an assistant professor at Texas A&M university in the Political Science department until 1993, when she started a position as associate professor in the Political Science department at the University of Iowa until 2000. From 2001 to 2020, she held a full professor position in the Department of Politics at New York University. She had a joint appointment between New York University New York and New York University Abu Dhabi.

Morton founded the Winter Experimental Social Science Institute (WESSI) and has founded and directed the Social Sciences Experimental Laboratory (SSEL) at New York University Abu Dhabi.

== Research ==
Morton's research contributed in three main areas in political science: (1) American Politics, (2) Political Economy, and (3) Experimental Political Science Methodology. In American Politics, Morton's work advanced understanding on how institutions and procedures affect voting outcomes. In her book, Learning by Voting: Sequence in Presidential Primaries and Other Elections (University of Michigan Press, 2001) and article "Information Asymmetries and Simultaneous versus Sequential Voting" (1999), co-authored with Kenneth Williams, they explore the effects of voting sequentially (such as presidential primaries in the United States or elections with mail-in and absentee voting) on the amount of information available to voters and the candidates that voters select. In her 2007 work with Marco Battaglini and Thomas Palfrey, "Efficiency, Equity, and Timing of Voting Mechanisms", they compare how different voting rules – simultaneous and sequential voting – affect information aggregation and the distribution of the costs of voting among voters. Morton's work also explores how different institutions of primaries (closed vs. open) affect the selection of ideologically extreme candidates in "Primary Election Systems and Representation" (1998) with Elizabeth Gerber and how multimember district elections with different voting rules – straight and cumulative voting – affect the representation of minority candidates "Minority Representation in Multimember Districts" (1998) with Elizabeth Gerber and Thomas Reitz and "Majority Requirements and Minority Representation" also coauthored with Reitz.

Morton proposed the group-based theory of turnout to explain the "paradox of not voting", which refers to the fact that people turn out to vote even though the when? expected benefit does not seem to outweigh the costs of engaging in the activity, given that an individual's vote has close to zero chances of affecting electoral outcomes. In a series of publications, she argues that positive turnout may be partially explained by incorporating the role of groups into the voter's calculation. Her theory posits that when the expected benefit of voting is calculated at the group level – with the voter being a member of the group – the rational individual has an incentive to turn out and vote.

In the area of Political Economy, Morton was also a pioneer in advocating for empirical tests of the formal models in political economy. She made a noteworthy effort to bridge the gap between the formal mathematical models of voting and empirical methods, mainly through laboratory experiments, as stated in the Introductory Chapter of the Cambridge Handbook of Experimental Political Science. In her book, Methods and Models: A Guide to the Empirical Analysis of Formal Models in Political Science (Cambridge University Press, 1999), Morton provides a detailed and thoughtful guideline for scholars who engage in empirical analysis with formal models. Morton's research used laboratory experiments to test various formal models of voting rules on electoral outcomes. Some noticeable examples were her work with Kenneth Williams on how simultaneous and sequential voting affect information asymmetry among voters; and how less informed voters delegate their decisions to more informed voters by abstaining, which is called the "swing voter's curse". She also questioned the conditions under which group versus individual decision-making can lead to better outcomes.

Finally, Morton influenced the rapid growth of experiments in political science from the 1990s onward through multiple published works on experimental methodology in political science, co-founding and presiding over the American Political Science Association's organized section on Experimental Research, co-founding and co-editing the Journal of Experimental Political Science, co-founding and directing the Social Science Experimental Laboratory at New York University Abu-Dhabi (one of few such laboratories in the Middle East), and founding the Winter Experimental Social Science Institute (WESSI). Her published works include the textbook Experimental Political Science and the Study of Causality: From Nature to the Lab coauthored with Kenneth Williams, which is frequently used as a textbook for political science graduate student courses in experimental methodology, and which won "Best Book" award from the American Political Science Association section on Experimental Research in 2011. In this book, she contrasts the Rubin Causal Model and the Formal Theory Approach to causality.

Morton's substantive expertise in the application of experimental methods in political science revolved around using experiments to analyze the effect of electoral systems and voting, writing a coauthored chapter entitled "Electoral Systems and Strategic Voting (Laboratory Election Experiments)" in the Cambridge Handbook of Experimental Political Science. Morton was considered to be one of an initial cohort of political scientists to advocate for the expansion of the use of experiments from the life sciences to political science, contributing the Chapter "Experimentation in Political Science" (2008) to the Oxford Handbook of Political Methodology.
