= Ronald R. Yager =

American computer scientist

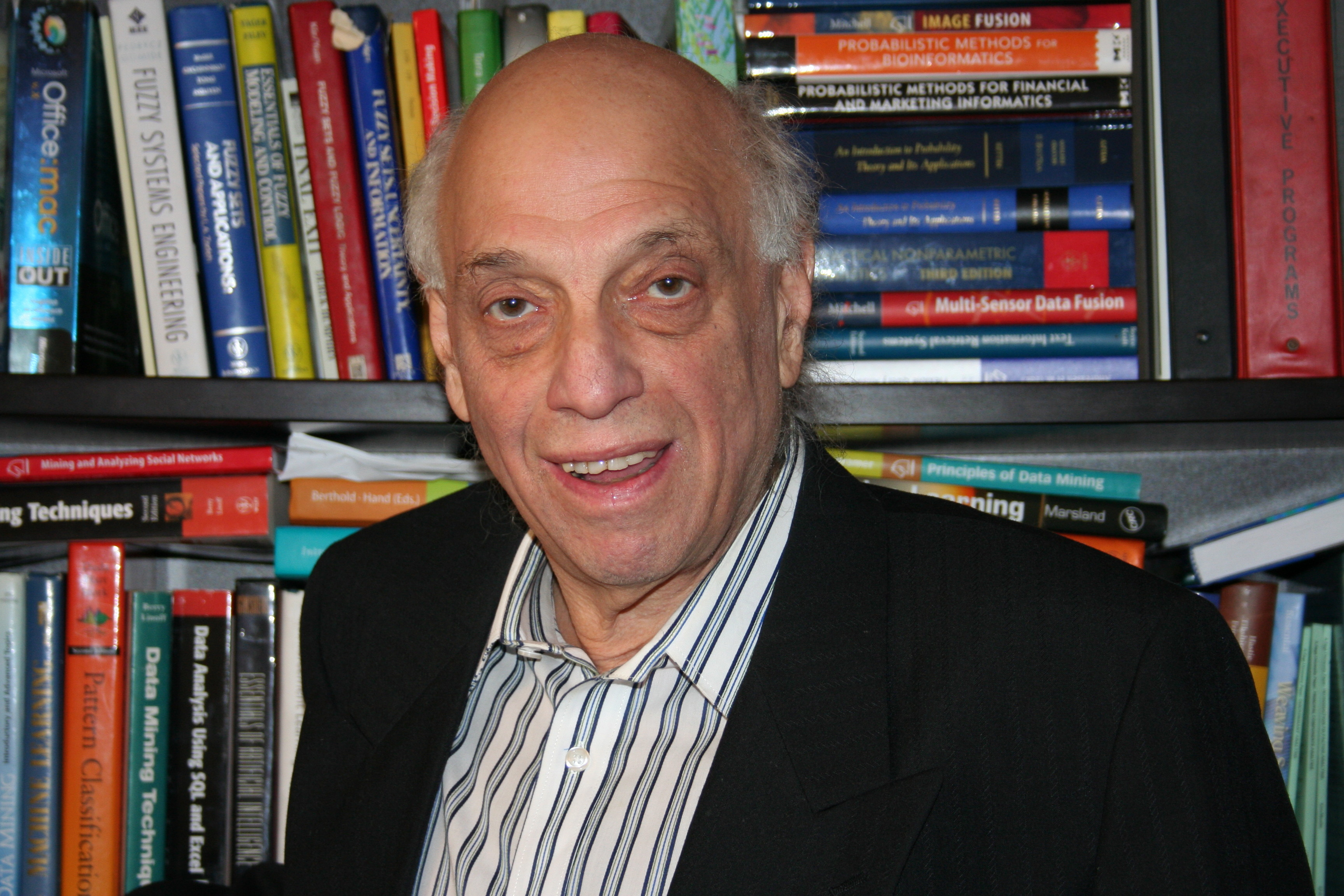
- Born: New York City, United States
- Education: City College of New York, Polytechnic Institute of Brooklyn
- Known for: Ordered weighted averaging aggregation operators, Fuzzy sets
- Awards: IEEE Pioneer Award in Fuzzy Systems
- Scientific career
- Fields: Computational Intelligence
- Workplaces: Iona College (New York)

Ronald Robert Yager (born New York City) is an American researcher in computational intelligence, decision making under uncertainty and fuzzy logic. He is currently Director of the Machine Intelligence Institute and Professor of Information Systems at Iona College.

Ronald Yager has been an active IEEE Fellow since 1997 for his contributions to the development of the theory of fuzzy logic. He is the Editor and Chief of the International Journal of Intelligent Systems. He has also been invited to serve on the Editorial Boards and Executive Advisory Boards in a number of international journals, which include the following: IEEE Intelligent Systems, IEEE Transactions on Fuzzy Systems, and Fuzzy Sets and Systems.

== Biography ==
Ronald R. Yager was born in the University Heights neighborhood of the Bronx, New York City and attended elementary and DeWitt Clinton High School in the New York City public school system. He got a bachelor's degree in Electrical Engineering from the City College of New York. He holds a Ph.D. in Systems Science, a degree that he got from the Polytechnic Institute of Brooklyn (now known as the Polytechnic Institute of New York University). He is currently Director of the Machine Intelligence Institute and Professor of Information Systems at Iona College (New York). He previously taught at the Pennsylvania State University.

== Honors and awards ==
- Recipient of IEEE Frank Rosenblatt Award, 2016
- Recipient of 2006 FLINS Gold Medal (Fuzzy Logic and Intelligent Technologies in Nuclear Science)
- Recipient of IEEE Outstanding Contributor Award Granular Computing, 2006
- Recipient of Medal of the 50th Anniversary of the Polish Academy of Sciences, 2005
- IEEE Computational Intelligence Society Fuzzy Systems Pioneer Award, 2004
- Fellow of the IEEE for contributions to the development of the theory of fuzzy logic
- Fellow New York of the Academy of Sciences
- Fellow of the International Fuzzy Systems Association
- Honoris Causa, Rostov on the Don University, Russia
- Three-year NASA Fellowship
- Tau Beta Pi, Eta Kappa Nu, Sigma Xi, Cum Laude
