= Facility location problem =

A facility location problem is the problem of deciding where a given public facility (e.g. a school or a power station) should be placed. This problem has been studied from various angles.

- Optimal facility location is an optimization problem: deciding where to place the facility in order to minimize transportation costs while considering factors like avoiding placing hazardous materials near housing.
- Facility location (competitive game) is a problem in game theory: finding an equilibrium in a game in which the players are different producers, each of which looks for a location for placing a facility in order to attract as many consumers as possible.
- Facility location (cooperative game) is the problem of how to share the cost of opening new facilities between the clients enjoying these facilities.
