= Facility location =

Facility location is a name given to several different problems in computer science and in game theory:

- Optimal facility location, the optimal placement of facilities as a function of transportation costs and other factors
- Facility location (competitive game), in which competitors simultaneously select facility locations and prices, in order to maximize profit
- Facility location (cooperative game), with the goal of sharing costs among clients
