= Demand-responsive transport =

Shared transport services based only on demand without fixed routes or timetables

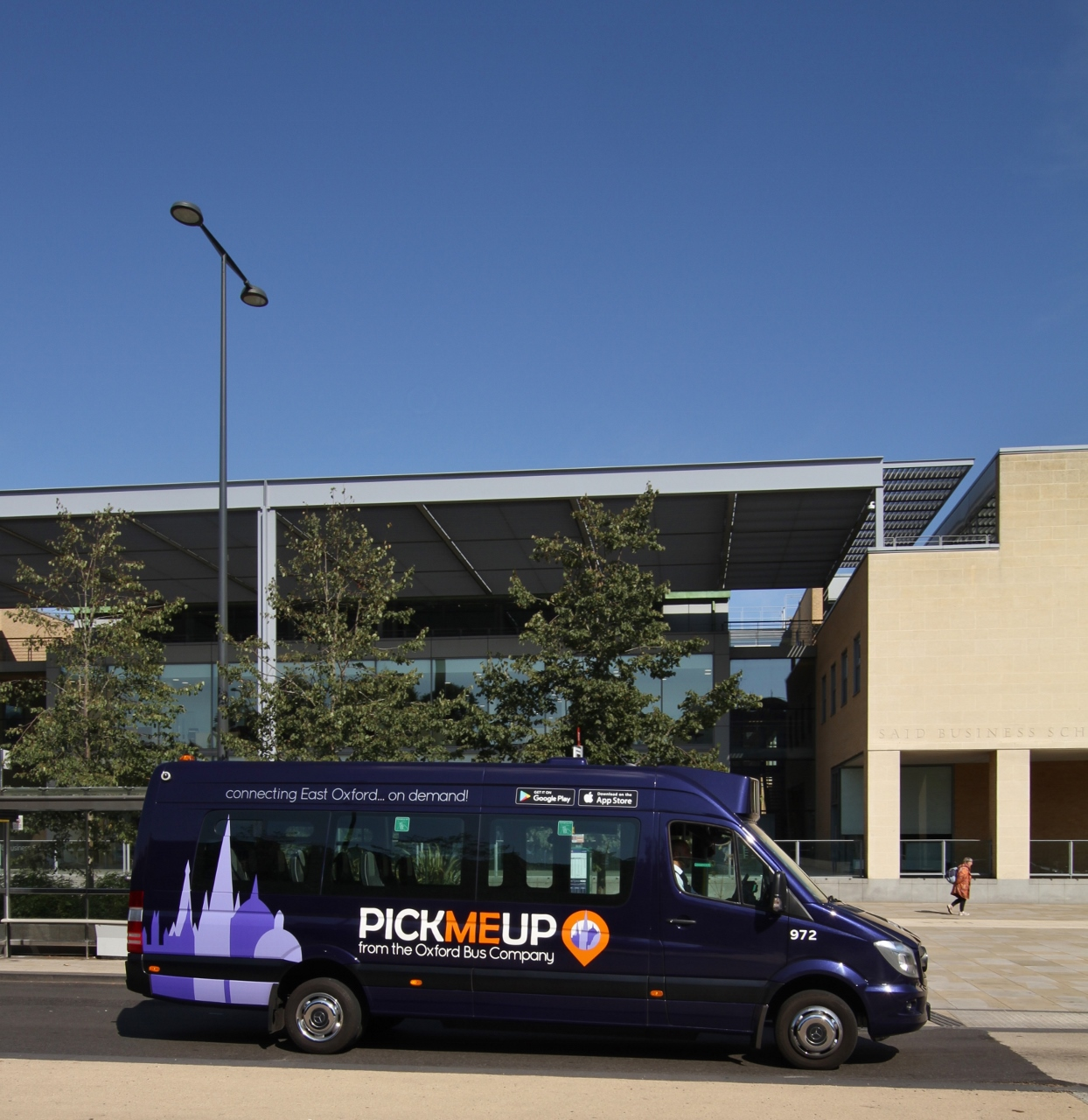
Demand-responsive bus service of the Oxford Bus Company in 2018

Demand-responsive transport (DRT), also known as demand-responsive transit, demand-responsive service, Dial-a-Ride transit (sometimes DART), flexible transport services, microtransit, non-emergency medical transport (NEMT), carpool or on-demand bus service is a form of shared private or quasi-public transport for groups traveling where vehicles alter their routes each journey based on particular transport demand without using a fixed route or timetabled journeys. These vehicles typically pick-up and drop-off passengers in locations according to passengers needs and can include taxis, buses or other vehicles. Passengers can typically summon the service with a mobile phone app or by telephone; telephone is particularly relevant to older users who may not be conversant with technology.

One of the most widespread types of demand-responsive transport (DRT) is to provide a public transport service in areas of low passenger demand where a regular bus service is not considered to be financially viable, such as rural and peri-urban areas. Services may also be provided for particular types of passengers. One example is the paratransit programs for people with a disability. The provision of public transport in this manner emphasises one of its functions as a social service rather than creating a viable movement network.

== Definition ==
DRT and other kinds of transport

DRT can be used to refer to many different types of transport. When taxicabs were first introduced to many cities, they were hailed as an innovative form of DRT. They are still referred to as DRT in some jurisdictions around the world as their very nature is to take people from point-to-point based on their needs. More recently, DRT generally refers to a type of public transport. They are distinct from fixed-route services as they do not always operate to a specific timetable or route. While specific operations vary widely, generally a particular area is designated for service by DRT. Once a certain number of people have requested a trip, the most efficient route will then be calculated depending on the origins and destinations of passengers. Share taxis are another form of DRT. They are usually operated on an ad hoc basis but also do not have fixed routes or times and change their route and frequency depending on demand. Some DRT systems operate as a service that can deviate from a fixed route. These operate along a fixed alignment or path at specific times but may deviate to collect or drop off passengers who have requested the deviation.

== Comparison of demand-responsiveness by type ==
- Fully flexible route, fully flexible schedule, no booking – personal vehicle, foot

=== Shared vehicle ===
- Fully flexible route, fully flexible schedule, booking – minicab
- Fully flexible route, fully flexible schedule, no booking – taxi

==== Shared journey ====
- highly flexible route, highly flexible schedule, mobile booking – microtransit
- some degree of flexible route or schedule, no booking – share taxi/taxibus
- some degree of flexible route or schedule, booking – paratransit
- fixed route and fixed schedule, no booking – bus
- fixed route and fixed schedule, booking – coach, aeroplane

== Operation ==
DRT services are restricted to a defined operating zone, within which journeys must start and finish. Journeys may be completely free form, or following skeleton routes and schedules, varied as required, with users given a specified pick-up point and a time window for collection. Some DRT systems may have defined termini, at one or both ends of a route, such as an urban centre, airport or transport interchange, for onward connections.

DRT systems require passengers to request a journey in advance. They may do this by booking with a central dispatcher who determines the journey options available given the user's location and destination. Increasingly, the booking is via an app, which provides the interface to software that creates a schedule in real time; adjusting the schedule to accept (or reject) bookings as they come in. This provides an instant decision for the potential user, but at the cost of efficiency: each individual travel need is considered individually, potentially resulting in higher levels of idle time (when the schedule has gaps that are too short to allow an additional journey to be added) and "dead mileage" (driving empty between one drop-off and the next pickup) than might be expected from a schedule built by an experienced human operator.

DRT systems take advantage of fleet telematics technology in the form of vehicle location systems, scheduling and dispatching software and hand-held/in vehicle computing. Vehicles used for DRT services are typically small minibuses sufficient for low ridership, which allow the service to provide as near a door-to-door service as practical by using narrower residential streets. In some cases taxicabs are hired by the DRT provider to serve their routes on request.

DRT schemes may be fully or partially funded by the local transit authority, with operators selected by public tendering or other methods. Other schemes may be partially or fully self-funded as community centred not for profit social enterprises (such as a community interest company in the UK). They may also be provided by private companies for commercial reasons; some conventional bus operating companies have set up DRT-style airport bus services, which compete with larger private hire airport shuttle companies.

== Health and environmental effects ==
DRT can potentially reduce the number of vehicles on the road, and hence pollution and congestion, if many people are persuaded to use it instead of private cars or taxis.

For a model of a hypothetical large-scale demand-responsive public transport system for the Helsinki metropolitan area, simulation results published in 2005 demonstrated that "in an urban area with one million inhabitants, trip aggregation could reduce the health, environmental, and other detrimental impacts of car traffic typically by 50–70%, and if implemented could attract about half of the car passengers, and within a broad operational range would require no public subsidies".

== Licensing ==
DRT schemes may require new or amended legislation, or special dispensation, to operate, as they do not meet the traditional licensing model of authorised bus transport providers or licensed taxicab operators. The status has caused controversy between bus and taxi operators when the DRT service picks up passengers without pre-booking, due to the licensing issues. Issues may also arise surrounding tax and fuel subsidy for DRT services.

== Effectiveness ==
Ridership on DRT services is usually quite low (less than ten passengers per vehicle-revenue hour), but DRT can provide coverage effectively.

Analysis of the Yorbus DRT scheme in a rural area of the UK showed very little combination of individual travel needs. Of the 35% of operating hours when the vehicles were carrying passengers, there was just one passenger (or a couple travelling together) for 74% of the time, and two passengers (or couples travelling together) for a further 20% of the time. The 15-seat minibuses could have been replaced by small taxis without capacity problems for 97% of the operating hours.

== See also ==
- Hail and ride
- Microtransit
- Open data
- Paratransit
- Share taxi
- Route assignment
- Wardrop equilibrium
