= Surplus sharing =

Type of fair division problem

Surplus sharing is a kind of a fair division problem where the goal is to share the financial benefits of cooperation (the "economic surplus") among the cooperating agents. As an example, suppose there are several workers such that each worker i, when working alone, can gain some amount u_{i}. When they all cooperate in a joint venture, the total gain is u_{1}+...+u_{n}+s, where s>0. This s is called the surplus of cooperation, and the question is: what is a fair way to divide s among the n agents?

When the only available information is the u_{i}, there are two main solutions:

- Equal sharing: each agent i gets u_{i}+s/n, that is, each agent gets an equal share of the surplus.
- Proportional sharing: each agent i gets u_{i}+(s*u_{i}/Σu_{i}), that is, each agent gets a share of the surplus proportional to his external value (similar to the proportional rule in bankruptcy). In other words, u_{i} is considered a measure of the agent's contribution to the joint venture.

Kolm calls the equal sharing "leftist" and the proportional sharing "rightist".

Chun presents a characterization of the proportional rule.

Moulin presents a characterization of the equal and proportional rule together by four axioms (in fact, any three of these axioms are sufficient):

1. Separability - the division of surplus within any coalition T should depend only on the total amount allocated to T, and on the opportunity costs of agents within T.
2. No advantageous reallocation - no coalition can benefit from redistributing its u_{i} among its members (this is a kind of strategyproofness axiom).
3. Additivity - for each agent i, the allocation to i is a linear function of the total surplus s.
4. Path independence - for each agent i, the allocation to i from surplus s is the same as allocating a part of s, updating the u_{i}, and then allocating the remaining part of s.

Any pair of these axioms characterizes a different family of rules, which can be viewed as a compromise between equal and proportional sharing.

When there is information about the possible gains of sub-coalitions (e.g., it is known how much agents 1,2 can gain when they collaborate in separation from the other agents), other solutions become available, for example, the Shapley value.

== See also ==
- Bankruptcy problem - a similar problem in which the goal is to share losses (negative gains).
- Cost-sharing mechanism - a similar problem in which the goal is to share costs.
- Frederic G. Mather, Both sides of profit sharing: an 1896 article about the need to share the surplus of work fairly between employees and employers.
