= Continuous game =

Generalization of games used in game theory

A continuous game is a mathematical concept, used in game theory, that generalizes the idea of an ordinary game like tic-tac-toe (noughts and crosses) or checkers (draughts). In other words, it extends the notion of a discrete game, where the players choose from a finite set of pure strategies. The continuous game concepts allows games to include more general sets of pure strategies, which may be uncountably infinite.

In general, a game with uncountably infinite strategy sets will not necessarily have a Nash equilibrium solution. If, however, the strategy sets are required to be compact and the utility functions continuous, then a Nash equilibrium will be guaranteed; this is by Glicksberg's generalization of the Kakutani fixed point theorem. The class of continuous games is for this reason usually defined and studied as a subset of the larger class of infinite games (i.e. games with infinite strategy sets) in which the strategy sets are compact and the utility functions continuous.

== Formal definition ==
Define the n-player continuous game $G = (P, \mathbf{C}, \mathbf{U})$ where

$P = {1, 2, 3,\ldots, n}$ is the set of $n\,$ players,
$\mathbf{C}= (C_1, C_2, \ldots, C_n)$ where each $C_i\,$ is a compact set, in a metric space, corresponding to the $i\,$ th player's set of pure strategies,
$\mathbf{U}= (u_1, u_2, \ldots, u_n)$ where $u_i:\mathbf{C}\to \R$ is the utility function of player $i\,$

We define $\Delta_i\,$ to be the set of Borel probability measures on $C_i\,$, giving us the mixed strategy space of player i.
Define the strategy profile $\boldsymbol{\sigma} = (\sigma_1, \sigma_2, \ldots, \sigma_n)$ where $\sigma_i \in \Delta_i\,$

Let $\boldsymbol{\sigma}_{-i}$ be a strategy profile of all players except for player $i$. As with discrete games, we can define a best response correspondence for player $i\,$, $b_i\$. $b_i\,$ is a relation from the set of all probability distributions over opponent player profiles to a set of player $i$'s strategies, such that each element of

$$b_i(\sigma_{-i})\,$$

is a best response to $\sigma_{-i}$. Define

$$\mathbf{b}(\boldsymbol{\sigma}) = b_1(\sigma_{-1}) \times b_2(\sigma_{-2}) \times \cdots \times b_n(\sigma_{-n})$$.

A strategy profile $\boldsymbol{\sigma}*$ is a Nash equilibrium if and only if $\boldsymbol{\sigma}* \in \mathbf{b}(\boldsymbol{\sigma}*)$ The existence of a Nash equilibrium for any continuous game with continuous utility functions can be proven using Irving Glicksberg's generalization of the Kakutani fixed point theorem. In general, there may not be a solution if we allow strategy spaces, $C_i\,$'s which are not compact, or if we allow non-continuous utility functions.

=== Separable games ===
A separable game is a continuous game where, for any i, the utility function $u_i:\mathbf{C}\to \R$ can be expressed in the sum-of-products form:

$u_i(\mathbf{s}) = \sum_{k_1=1}^{m_1} \ldots \sum_{k_n=1}^{m_n} a_{i\, ,\, k_1\ldots k_n} f_1(s_1)\ldots f_n(s_n)$, where $\mathbf{s} \in \mathbf{C}$, $s_i \in C_i$, $a_{i\, ,\, k_1\ldots k_n} \in \R$, and the functions $f_{i\, ,\, k}:C_i \to \R$ are continuous.

A polynomial game is a separable game where each $C_i\,$ is a compact interval on $\R\,$ and each utility function can be written as a multivariate polynomial.

In general, mixed Nash equilibria of separable games are easier to compute than non-separable games as implied by the following theorem:

For any separable game there exists at least one Nash equilibrium where player i mixes at most $m_i+1\,$ pure strategies.

Whereas an equilibrium strategy for a non-separable game may require an uncountably infinite support, a separable game is guaranteed to have at least one Nash equilibrium with finitely supported mixed strategies.

== Examples ==
=== Separable games ===
==== A polynomial game ====
Consider a zero-sum 2-player game between players X and Y, with $C_X = C_Y = \left [0,1 \right ]$. Denote elements of $C_X\,$ and $C_Y\,$ as $x\,$ and $y\,$ respectively. Define the utility functions $H(x,y) = u_x(x,y) = -u_y(x,y)\,$ where

$$H(x,y)=(x-y)^2\,$$.

The pure strategy best response relations are:

$$b_X(y) =
\begin{cases}
1,  & \mbox{if  }y \in \left [0,1/2 \right ) \\
0\text{ or }1, & \mbox{if }y = 1/2 \\
0, & \mbox{if  } y \in \left (1/2,1 \right ]
\end{cases}$$

$$b_Y(x) = x\,$$

$b_X(y)\,$ and $b_Y(x)\,$ do not intersect, so there is no pure strategy Nash equilibrium. However, there should be a mixed strategy equilibrium. To find it, express the expected value, $v = \mathbb{E} [H(x,y)]$ as a linear combination of the first and second moments of the probability distributions of X and Y:

$$v = \mu_{X2} - 2\mu_{X1} \mu_{Y1} + \mu_{Y2}\,$$

(where $\mu_{XN} = \mathbb{E} [x^N]$ and similarly for Y).

The constraints on $\mu_{X1}\,$ and $\mu_{X2}$ (with similar constraints for y,) are given by Hausdorff as:

$$\begin{align}
\mu_{X1} \ge \mu_{X2} \\
\mu_{X1}^2 \le \mu_{X2}
\end{align}
\qquad
\begin{align}
\mu_{Y1} \ge \mu_{Y2} \\
\mu_{Y1}^2 \le \mu_{Y2}
\end{align}$$

Each pair of constraints defines a compact convex subset in the plane. Since $v\,$ is linear, any extrema with respect to a player's first two moments will lie on the boundary of this subset. Player i's equilibrium strategy will lie on

$$\mu_{i1} = \mu_{i2} \text{ or } \mu_{i1}^2 = \mu_{i2}$$

Note that the first equation only permits mixtures of 0 and 1 whereas the second equation only permits pure strategies. Moreover, if the best response at a certain point to player i lies on $\mu_{i1} = \mu_{i2}\,$, it will lie on the whole line, so that both 0 and 1 are a best response. $b_Y(\mu_{X1},\mu_{X2})\,$ simply gives the pure strategy $y = \mu_{X1}\,$, so $b_Y\,$ will never give both 0 and 1. However $b_x\,$ gives both 0 and 1 when y = 1/2. A Nash equilibrium exists when:

$$(\mu_{X1}*, \mu_{X2}*, \mu_{Y1}*, \mu_{Y2}*) = (1/2, 1/2, 1/2, 1/4)\,$$

This determines one unique equilibrium where Player X plays a random mixture of 0 for 1/2 of the time and 1 the other 1/2 of the time. Player Y plays the pure strategy of 1/2. The value of the game is 1/4.

=== Non-Separable Games ===
==== A rational payoff function ====
Consider a zero-sum 2-player game between players X and Y, with $C_X = C_Y = \left [0,1 \right ]$. Denote elements of $C_X\,$ and $C_Y\,$ as $x\,$ and $y\,$ respectively. Define the utility functions $H(x,y) = u_x(x,y) = -u_y(x,y)\,$ where

$$H(x,y)=\frac{(1+x)(1+y)(1-xy)}{(1+xy)^2}.$$

This game has no pure strategy Nash equilibrium. It can be shown that a unique mixed strategy Nash equilibrium exists with the following pair of cumulative distribution functions:

$$F^*(x) = \frac{4}{\pi} \arctan{\sqrt{x}} \qquad G^*(y) = \frac{4}{\pi} \arctan{\sqrt{y}}.$$

Or, equivalently, the following pair of probability density functions:

$$f^*(x) = \frac{2}{\pi \sqrt{x} (1+x)} \qquad g^*(y) = \frac{2}{\pi \sqrt{y} (1+y)}.$$

The value of the game is $4/\pi$.

==== Requiring a Cantor distribution ====
Consider a zero-sum 2-player game between players X and Y, with $C_X = C_Y = \left [0,1 \right ]$. Denote elements of $C_X\,$ and $C_Y\,$ as $x\,$ and $y\,$ respectively. Define the utility functions $H(x,y) = u_x(x,y) = -u_y(x,y)\,$ where

$$H(x,y)=\sum_{n=0}^\infty \frac{1}{2^n}\left(2x^n-\left (\left(1-\frac{x}{3} \right )^n-\left (\frac{x}{3}\right)^n \right ) \right ) \left(2y^n - \left (\left(1-\frac{y}{3} \right )^n-\left (\frac{y}{3}\right)^n \right ) \right )$$.

This game has a unique mixed strategy equilibrium where each player plays a mixed strategy with the Cantor singular function as the cumulative distribution function.

== See also ==
- Nonatomic game - a game with continuously many players, but a finite set of actions.
- Graph continuous
