= Fractionally subadditive valuation =

A set function is called fractionally subadditive, or XOS (not to be confused with OXS), if it is the maximum of several non-negative additive set functions. This valuation class was defined, and termed XOS, by Noam Nisan, in the context of combinatorial auctions. The term fractionally subadditive was given by Uriel Feige.

== Definition ==
There is a finite base set of items, $M := \{1,\ldots,m\}$.

There is a function $v$ which assigns a number to each subset of $M$.

The function $v$ is called fractionally subadditive (or XOS) if there exists a collection of set functions, $\{a_1,\ldots,a_l\}$, such that:

- Each $a_j$ is additive, i.e., it assigns to each subset $X\subseteq M$, the sum of the values of the items in $X$.
- The function $v$ is the pointwise maximum of the functions $a_j$. I.e, for every subset $X\subseteq M$:

$$v(X) = \max_{j=1}^l a_j(X)$$

=== Equivalent Definition ===
The name fractionally subadditive comes from the following equivalent definition when restricted to non-negative additive functions: a set function $v$ is fractionally subadditive if, for any $S\subseteq M$ and any collection $\{\alpha_i, T_i\}_{i=1}^k$ with $\alpha_i > 0$ and $T_i\subseteq M$ such that $\sum_{T_i \ni j} \alpha_i \ge 1$ for all $j\in S$, we have $v(S) \le \sum_{i=1}^k \alpha_i v(T_i)$.

== Relation to other utility functions ==
Every submodular set function is XOS, and every XOS function is a subadditive set function.

See also: Utility functions on indivisible goods.

== Etymology ==
The term XOS stands for XOR-of-ORs of Singleton valuations.

A Singleton valuation is a valuation function $v(\cdot)$ such that there exists a value $w$ and item $i$ such that $v(S):=w$ if and only if $i \in S$, and $v(S):=0$ otherwise. That is, a Singleton valuation has value $w$ for receiving item $i$ and has no value for any other items.

An OR of valuations $\{v_1(\cdot),v_2(\cdot),\ldots,v_k(\cdot)\}$ interprets each $v_j(\cdot)$ as representing a distinct player. The OR of $\{v_1(\cdot),v_2(\cdot),\ldots,v_k(\cdot)\}$ is a valuation function $v(\cdot)$ such that $v(S):=\max_{S_1,\ldots, S_k\text{ s.th. }S_j\cap S_\ell = \emptyset\ \forall j,\ell\text{ and } \cup_j S_j = S} \{\sum_{j=1}^k v_j(S_j)\}$. That is, the OR of valuations $\{v_1(\cdot),v_2(\cdot),\ldots,v_k(\cdot)\}$ is the optimal welfare that can be achieved by partitioning $S$ among players with valuations $\{v_1(\cdot),v_2(\cdot),\ldots,v_k(\cdot)\}$. The term "OR" refers to the fact that any of the players $\{v_1(\cdot),v_2(\cdot),\ldots,v_k(\cdot)\}$ can receive items. Observe that an OR of Singleton valuations is an additive function.

An XOR of valuations $\{v_1(\cdot),\ldots, v_k(\cdot)\}$ is a valuation function $v(\cdot)$ such that $v(S):=\max_{j} \{v_j(S)\}$. The term "XOR" refers to the fact that exactly one (an "exclusive or") of the players can receive items. Observe that an XOR of additive functions is XOS.
