= Facility location (cooperative game) =

The cooperative facility location game is a cooperative game of cost sharing. The goal is to share the cost of opening new facilities between the clients enjoying these facilities. The game has the following components:

- There are several consumers who need a certain service, e.g., electricity connection.
- There are several locations where facilities (e.g. power-stations) can be built.
- For every pair of consumer (C) and location (L), there is a fixed cost of serving C from L (e.g., depending on the distance between the power station and the consumer's house). This cost is denoted Cost[C,L].
- The cost of serving a group of consumers is lower than the sum of the cost of serving each consumer alone.

EXAMPLE:

- There are two facilities, F1 which costs 2 and F2 which costs 2.
- There are three consumers, Alice Bob and Carl.
- Alice can be served only from F1, with cost 2. So the cost of serving her alone is 2+2=4.
- Bob can be served from F1 with cost 2 or from F2 with cost 1. So the cost of serving him alone is 2+1=3.
- Carl can be served only from F2, with cost 1. So the cost of serving him alone is 2+1=3.
- The cost of serving Alice and Bob is 2+2+2=6 (by building only F1).
- The cost of serving Bob and Carl is 2+1+1=4 (by building only F2).
- The cost of serving Alice and Carl is 2+2+2+1=7 (by building F1 and F2).
- The cost of serving all agents is 2+2+2+1+1=8.

The most socially-desirable outcome of the game is that all agents are served. The cost of this outcome (8 in the above example) can be shared among the agents. A cost-allocation is good if no sub-group of agents can deviate and get a lower cost for itself (such cost-allocation is said to be in the core of the game). In the above example:

- The cost-vector (5,2,1) is not in the core, since Alice can deviate and get a cost of only 4. Similarly, the vector (3,3,2) is not in the core since Bob and Carl can deviate together and get a total cost of only 4.
- The cost-vectors (4,2,2) and (4,1,3) are in the core.

A classic result in game-theory, the Bondareva–Shapley theorem, gives necessary and sufficient conditions for a game to have nonempty core.

== See also ==
- Facility location (optimization problem)
- Facility location (competitive game)
- Cost-sharing mechanism
