= Weak NP-completeness =

In computational complexity, an NP-complete (or NP-hard) problem is weakly NP-complete (or weakly NP-hard) if there is an algorithm for the problem whose running time is polynomial in the dimension of the problem and the magnitudes of the data involved (provided these are given as integers), rather than the base-two logarithms of their magnitudes. Such algorithms have running times that are exponential functions of their input size and are therefore not considered polynomial

For example, the NP-hard knapsack problem can be solved by a dynamic programming algorithm requiring a number of steps polynomial in the size of the knapsack and the number of items (assuming that all data are scaled to be integers); however, the runtime of this algorithm is exponential time since the input sizes of the objects and knapsack are logarithmic in their magnitudes. However, as Garey and Johnson (1979) observed, “A pseudo-polynomial-time algorithm … will display 'exponential behavior' only when confronted with instances containing 'exponentially large' numbers, [which] might be rare for the application we are interested in. If so, this type of algorithm might serve our purposes almost as well as a polynomial time algorithm.” Another example for a weakly NP-complete problem is the subset sum problem.

The related term strongly NP-complete (or unary NP-complete) refers to those problems that remain NP-complete even if the data are encoded in unary, that is, if the data are "small" relative to the overall input size.

== Strong and weak NP-hardness vs. strong and weak polynomial-time algorithms ==
Assuming P ≠ NP, the following are true for computational problems on integers:

- If a problem is weakly NP-hard, then it does not have a weakly polynomial time algorithm (polynomial in the number of integers and the number of bits in the largest integer), but it may have a pseudopolynomial time algorithm (polynomial in the number of integers and the magnitude of the largest integer). An example is the partition problem. Both weak NP-hardness and weak polynomial-time correspond to encoding the input integers in binary coding.
- If a problem is strongly NP-hard, then it does not even have a pseudo-polynomial time algorithm. It also does not have a fully-polynomial time approximation scheme. An example is the 3-partition problem. Both strong NP-hardness and pseudo-polynomial time correspond to encoding the input integers in unary coding.
