= QKP =

QKP may refer to:

- Communist Party of Kazakhstan (Qazaqstan Kommunistık Partiasy), a banned political party in Kazakhstan
- Quadratic knapsack problem, an extension of knapsack problem that allows for quadratic terms in the objective function
