= Pseudo-polynomial transformation =

Reduction between decision problems that preserves strong NP-completeness

In computational complexity theory, a pseudo-polynomial transformation is a kind of reduction between decision problems that preserves strong NP-completeness. It maps instances of one problem to instances of another in pseudo-polynomial time, while keeping both the size of the instance and the magnitude of its largest number under polynomial control. If a strongly NP-complete problem has a pseudo-polynomial transformation to a problem in NP, then that second problem is also strongly NP-complete.

== Definitions ==
=== Maximal numerical parameter ===
Some computational problems are parameterized by numbers whose magnitude exponentially exceeds the input size. For example, in the partition problem the input is a list of n positive integers, and the relevant numerical parameter is the largest of them. The problem can be solved by dynamic programming in time polynomial in n and the sum of the integers, which is exponential in the length of the binary encoding of the input, so the algorithm is pseudo-polynomial.

Let $\Pi$ be a computational problem whose instances are encoded as strings over an alphabet $\Sigma$. The function

$$\operatorname{Num}_\Pi: \Sigma^* \to \mathbb{N}$$

maps $w_I \in \Sigma^*$, the encoding of an instance $I$ of $\Pi$, to the maximal numerical parameter of $I$. It is assumed to be computable in polynomial time.

=== Pseudo-polynomial transformation ===
Let $\Pi_1$ and $\Pi_2$ be decision problems, and let $L_1 \subseteq \Sigma_1^*$ and $L_2 \subseteq \Sigma_2^*$ be the languages of encodings of their yes-instances, over alphabets $\Sigma_1$ and $\Sigma_2$ respectively.

A pseudo-polynomial transformation from $\Pi_1$ to $\Pi_2$ is a function $f: \Sigma_1^* \to \Sigma_2^*$ such that

1. $\forall w \in \Sigma_1^* \quad w \in L_1 \iff f(w) \in L_2$
2. $\forall w \in \Sigma_1^* \quad f(w)$ can be computed in time polynomial in the two variables $\operatorname{Num}_{\Pi_1}(w)$ and $|w|$
3. $\exists Q_A \in \mathbb{N}[X] \quad\forall w \in \Sigma_1^* \quad |w| \leq Q_A(|f(w)|)$
4. $\exists Q_B \in \mathbb{N}[X,Y] \quad\forall w \in \Sigma_1^* \quad \operatorname{Num}_{\Pi_2}(f(w)) \leq Q_B(\operatorname{Num}_{\Pi_1}(w), |w|)$

Intuitively:

- Condition (1) says that f preserves answers, so instances of $\Pi_1$ can be decided by deciding their images under f (and back).
- Condition (2) says that the transformation is cheap: it runs in pseudo-polynomial time, and in particular the size of $f(w)$ is bounded by a polynomial in $\operatorname{Num}_{\Pi_1}(w)$ and $|w|$.
- Condition (4) says that the numbers in $f(w)$ do not blow up. Together with (2), it ensures that deciding $L_1$ by applying f and then a pseudo-polynomial decider for $L_2$ is pseudo-polynomial itself.
- Condition (3) says that $f(w)$ is not much shorter than w: the length of w is polynomially bounded in the length of $f(w)$. This allows bounds expressed in terms of $|w|$ to be re-expressed in terms of $|f(w)|$.
- Conditions (3) and (4) together ensure that a subproblem of $L_1$ witnessing strong NP-completeness (all instances have numerical parameters bounded by a polynomial in the input size, and the subproblem is itself NP-complete) is mapped into a subproblem of $L_2$ whose instances also have numerical parameters bounded by a polynomial in the input size.

== Proving strong NP-completeness ==
The following lemma allows to derive strong NP-completeness from the existence of a transformation:

If $\Pi_1$ is a strongly NP-complete decision problem, $\Pi_2$ is a decision problem in NP, and there exists a pseudo-polynomial transformation from $\Pi_1$ to $\Pi_2$, then $\Pi_2$ is strongly NP-complete

=== Proof of the lemma ===
Let $\Pi_1$ be a strongly NP-complete decision problem encoded by $L_1$ over $\Sigma_1$, and let $\Pi_2$ be a decision problem in NP encoded by $L_2$ over $\Sigma_2$. Let $f: \Sigma_1^* \to \Sigma_2^*$ be a pseudo-polynomial transformation from $\Pi_1$ to $\Pi_2$, with $Q_A$ and $Q_B$ as in the definition.

By the definition of strong NP-completeness, there is a polynomial $P \in \mathbb{N}[X]$ such that

$$L_{1/P} = \{w \in L_1 : \operatorname{Num}_{\Pi_1}(w) \leq P(|w|) \}$$

is NP-complete. Define the polynomial $\widehat{P}(n) = Q_B(P(Q_A(n)),\, Q_A(n))$. All of $P$, $Q_A$ and $Q_B$ have coefficients in $\mathbb{N}$, so they are non-decreasing.

For any $w$ with $\operatorname{Num}_{\Pi_1}(w) \leq P(|w|)$,

$$\begin{aligned}
\operatorname{Num}_{\Pi_2}(f(w)) &\leq Q_B(\operatorname{Num}_{\Pi_1}(w), |w|)         && \text{(condition 4)} \\[4pt]
&\leq Q_B(P(|w|), |w|)                   && \text{(bound on } \operatorname{Num}_{\Pi_1}(w) \text{; monotonicity of } Q_B\text{)} \\[4pt]
&\leq Q_B(P(Q_A(|f(w)|)), Q_A(|f(w)|)) && \text{(condition 3; monotonicity of } P, Q_B\text{)} \\[4pt]
&= \widehat{P}(|f(w)|)                  && \text{(definition of } \widehat{P}\text{)}
\end{aligned}$$

Hence, by condition 1, f maps such w to strings in

$$L_{2/\widehat{P}} = \{v \in L_2 : \operatorname{Num}_{\Pi_2}(v) \leq \widehat{P}(|v|) \}$$

exactly when w is in $L_{1/P}$. Moreover, when $\operatorname{Num}_{\Pi_1}(w) \leq P(|w|)$, condition 2 shows that $f(w)$ is computable in time polynomial in $|w|$.

Now define g by $g(w) = f(w)$ if $\operatorname{Num}_{\Pi_1}(w) \leq P(|w|)$ (a polynomial-time check), and otherwise $g(w) = v_0$ for a fixed string $v_0 \notin L_{2/\widehat{P}}$. Then g is a polynomial-time many-one reduction from $L_{1/P}$ to $L_{2/\widehat{P}}$. Since $L_{1/P}$ is NP-complete, $L_{2/\widehat{P}}$ is NP-hard. It is also in NP, because $L_2$ is in NP and the bound $\operatorname{Num}_{\Pi_2}(v) \leq \widehat{P}(|v|)$ can be checked in polynomial time. Therefore $L_{2/\widehat{P}}$ is NP-complete.

By the definition of strong NP-completeness, it follows that $\Pi_2$ is strongly NP-complete. $\blacksquare$

== See also ==
- Strong NP-completeness
- Pseudo-polynomial time
- Reduction (complexity)
- Partition problem
