= Denomination (currency) =

Proper description of a currency amount

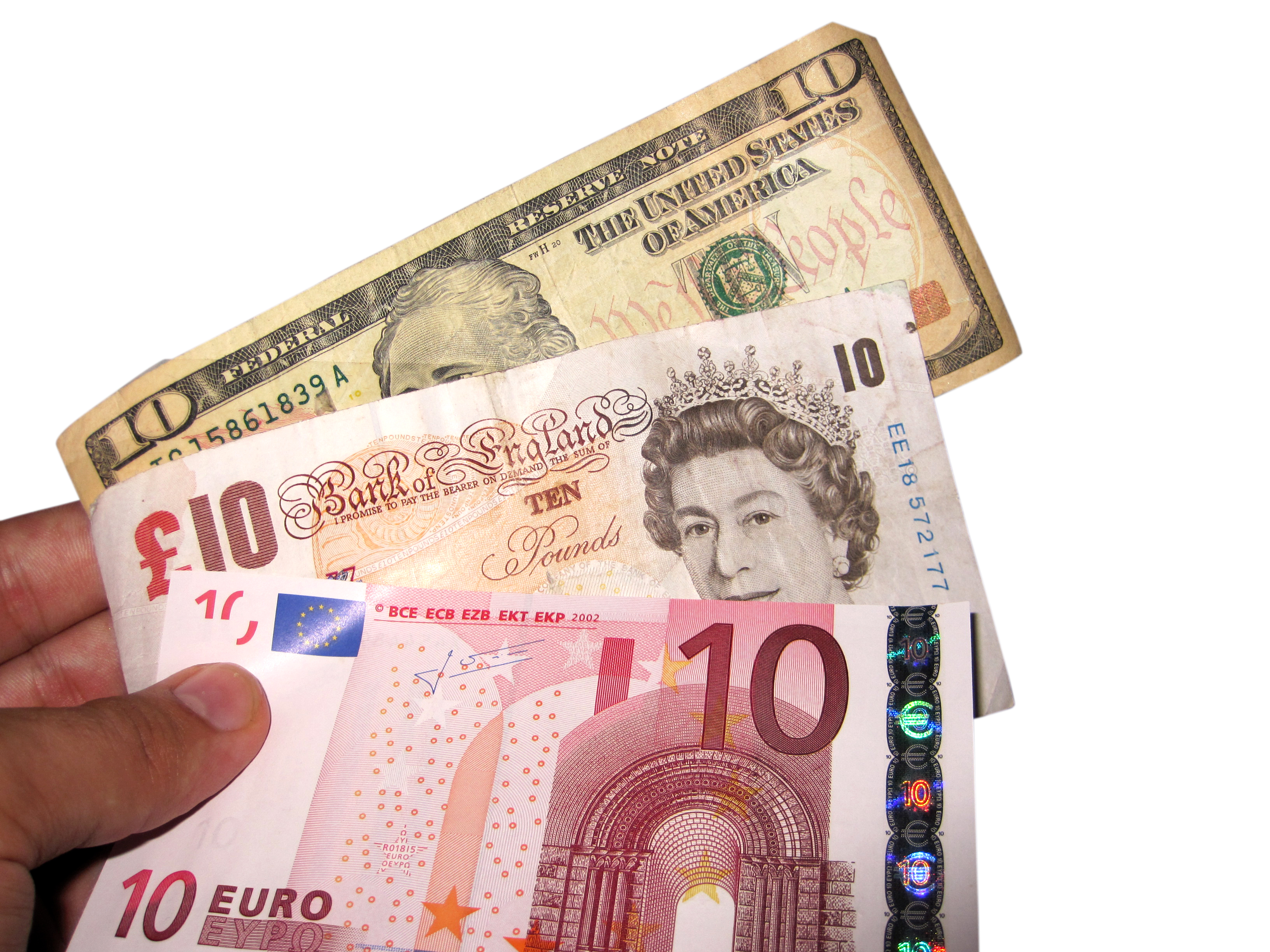
Banknotes with a face value of ten in the United States dollar, pound sterling as issued by the Bank of England, and euro.

Denomination is a proper description of a currency amount, usually for coins or banknotes. Denominations may also be used with other means of payment such as gift cards. For example, five euros is the denomination of a five-euro note.

== Subunit and super unit ==
In a currency, there is usually a main unit (base) and a subunit that is a fraction of the main unit. In some countries, there are multiple levels of subunits. In the former Ottoman Empire, 1 lira = 100 [kuruş] = 4000 para = 12000 [akçe]. Today, only a few places have more than one subunit, notably the Jordanian dinar is divided into 10 dirham, 100 qirsh/piastres, or 1000 fils. Many countries where Western European languages are spoken currently have their main units divided into 100 subunits. Some currencies that previously had subunits no longer do, because inflation has rendered the subunit useless. A prominent example is the Japanese yen, which was formerly divided into 100 sen or 1000 rin. Both subunits were demonetized at the end of 1953.

Occasionally, a super unit is used as a multiple of the main unit. Examples include Korean won = 5 yang in 1893, Iranian toman = 10 rials (used informally today). In the Ottoman Empire, lira and kuruş were super units at some point before becoming the main unit.

In the Indian subcontinent, it is common in Hindustani, as well as in both Indian and Pakistani English for large amounts of money to be discussed in lakhs and crores rather than in rupees. While they are not official denominations, they are drawn from the customary numerical system and are widely understood and utilised in the Indian, Pakistani, and Nepalese financial systems.

== Decimal vs. non-decimal ==
A decimal currency is a currency where the ratio between the main unit and the subunit is an integral power of 10. Non-decimal currencies are now rare but had some advantages in daily life transactions. For example, 1 South German Gulden = 60 Kreuzer. 60 can be divided into 2, 3, 4, 5, 6, 10, 12, 15, 20 or 30 parts that are still integers, making pricing easy. This advantage (in an age without mechanical or electronic calculators) and the lack of widespread accurate weighing apparatus (meaning an item might sometimes simply be divided in 2, 4, 5 etc.) coupled with tradition were the reasons why non-decimal currencies were used.

In theory, two countries currently use non-decimal currency: Mauritania (1 ouguiya = 5 khoums) and Madagascar (1 ariary = 5 iraimbilanja). In practice, however, the value of the main unit in each case is so low (less than 1/1000 of a United States dollar) that the sub-unit is not of any practical use and is rarely seen in circulation. In the case of the iraimbilanja, this is a carryover of the Madagascar's previous currency, the Malagasy franc, which had the ariary as a super unit worth 5 francs, and iraimbilanja was an alternate term for the franc. The last major countries to use non-decimal currencies in practice were the United Kingdom (until 1971), Ireland (1971), Malta (1972) and Nigeria (1973).

The "optimal denomination problem" is a problem for people who design entirely new currencies: What denominations should be chosen for the coins to minimize the average effort required to change into smaller denominations. As of 2014, most decimal currencies use a 1-2-5 series of coins, but some other set of denominations would require fewer denominations of coins or a smaller average number of coins to make change or both. Denominations of 3, 15 or 25 units are also in existence, or have been until recently.

== Display on coins ==
Historicaly, the denomination was not displayed on coins, although names of coins (such as drachma, as, sestertius etc.) were used in both colloquial and official language. It was only in the 1600s that Scandinavian coins began to display relative value on the smaller units (8, 16 skilling etc.) because there were many of them in circulation.

The monetary reform of Peter the Great in the Russian Empire not only established a strictly decimal monetary system (which was rather uncommon in other states at that time) but made the display of denomination (the "face value") mandatory on all coins. By the end of the 18th century, denomination appeared on most coins in Europe and the Ottoman Empire, and in the 19th century it became a common practice.

By the end of the 20th century, coins were mostly distinguished from medals or tokens by presence of denomination, either in monetary units or (for commemorative or bullion coins only) in the weight of a valuable metal. Exceptions are quite rare: for example, British commemorative crowns (initially with the value of 5 shillings, then 25 pence in decimal currency until the 1900s when it was established as 5 Pounds Sterling) traditionally do not display any face value, and are only recognized as such due to their typical size.

== Choice of name ==
It is common to name a unit with a unit of weight, such as pound, lira, shekel, and baht. In most cases, these currencies were originally defined as that amount of some precious metal. Another choice of name is some form of derivative of the political entity. The Afghan afghani and European euro fall into this category. Sometimes the name is simply the name of the metal of which the coins were or are made, such as Polish złoty ("golden") and Vietnamese đồng ("copper"), or its geographical origin, e.g. Joachimsthaler (see Dollar).

== See also ==
- Chronic inflation
- Denomination (postage stamp)
- Devaluation
- Face value
- Hyperinflation
- Redenomination
- Unit of account
