= 3-partition problem =

Strongly NP-complete problem in computer science

The 3-partition problem is a strongly NP-complete problem in computer science. The problem is to decide whether a given multiset of integers can be partitioned into triplets that all have the same sum. More precisely:

- Input: a multiset S containing n positive integer elements.
- Conditions: S must be partitionable into m triplets, S_{1}, S_{2}, ..., S_{m}, where n = 3m. These triplets partition S in the sense that they are disjoint and they cover S. The target value T is computed by taking the sum of all elements in S, then dividing by m.
- Output: whether or not there exists a partition of S such that, for all triplets, the sum of the elements in each triplet equals T.

The 3-partition problem remains strongly NP-complete under the restriction that every integer in S is strictly between T/4 and T/2.

== Example ==
1. The multiset $S = \{ 20, 23, 25, 30, 49, 45, 27, 30, 30, 40, 22, 19 \}$ can be partitioned into the four multisets $\{ 20, 25, 45 \}, \{ 23, 27, 40 \}, \{ 49, 22, 19 \} , \{ 30, 30, 30\}$, each of which sums to T = 90.
2. The set $S = \{1, 2, 5, 6, 7, 9\}$ can be partitioned into the two sets $\{1, 5, 9\}, \{2, 6, 7\}$ each of which sum to T = 15.
3. (every integer in S is strictly between T/4 and T/2): $S = \{4,5,5,5,5,6\}$, thus m=2, and T=15. There is feasible 3-partition $\{4,5,6\}, \{5,5,5\}$.
4. (every integer in S is strictly between T/4 and T/2): $S = \{4,4,4,6,6,6\}$, thus m=2, and T=15. There is no feasible solution.

== Strong NP-completeness ==
The 3-partition problem remains NP-complete even when the integers in S are bounded above by a polynomial in n. In other words, the problem remains NP-complete even when representing the numbers in the input instance in unary. i.e., 3-partition is NP-complete in the strong sense or strongly NP-complete. This property, and 3-partition in general, is useful in many reductions where numbers are naturally represented in unary.

== 3-Partition vs Partition ==
The 3-partition problem is similar to the partition problem, in which the goal is to partition S into two subsets with equal sum, and the multiway number partitioning, in which the goal is to partition S into k subsets with equal sum, where k is a fixed parameter. In 3-Partition the goal is to partition S into m = n/3 subsets, not just a fixed number of subsets, with equal sum. Partition is "easier" than 3-Partition: while 3-Partition is strongly NP-hard, Partition is only weakly NP-hard - it is hard only when the numbers are encoded in non-unary system, and have value exponential in n. When the values are polynomial in n, Partition can be solved in polynomial time using the pseudopolynomial time number partitioning algorithm.

== Variants ==
In the unrestricted-input variant, the inputs can be arbitrary integers; in the restricted-input variant, the inputs must be in (T/4, T/2). The restricted version is as hard as the unrestricted version: given an instance S_{u} of the unrestricted variant, construct a new instance of the restricted version S_{r} ≔ {s + 2 T | s ∈ S_{u}}. Every solution of S_{u} corresponds to a solution of S_{r} but with a sum of 7 T instead of T, and every element of S_{r} is in [2 T , 3 T ] which is contained in (7 T /4, 7 T /2).

In the distinct-input variant, the inputs must be in (T/4, T/2), and in addition, they must all be distinct integers. It, too, is as hard as the unrestricted version.

In the unrestricted-output variant, the m output subsets can be of arbitrary size - not necessarily 3 (but they still need to have the same sum T). The restricted-output variant can be reduced to the unrestricted-variant: given an instance S_{r} of the restricted variant, with 3m items summing up to mT, construct a new instance of the unrestricted variant S_{u} ≔ {s + 2T | s ∈ S_{r}}, with 3m items summing up to 7mT, and with target sum 7 T . Every solution of S_{r} naturally corresponds to a solution of S_{u}. Conversely, in every solution of S_{u}, since the target sum is 7 T and each element is in (7 T /4, 7 T /2), there must be exactly 3 elements per set, so it corresponds to a solution of S_{r}.

The ABC-partition problem (also called numerical 3-d matching) is a variant in which, instead of a set S with 3 m integers, there are three sets A, B, C with m integers in each. The sum of numbers in all sets is $m T$. The goal is to construct m triplets, each of which contains one element from A, one from B and one from C, such that the sum of each triplet is T.

The 4-partition problem is a variant in which S contains n = 4 m integers, the sum of all integers is $m T$, and the goal is to partition it into m quadruplets, all with a sum of T. It can be assumed that each integer is strictly between T/5 and T/3. Similarly, ABCD-partition is a variant of 4-partition in which there are 4 input sets and each quadruplet should contain one element from each set.

== Proofs ==
Garey and Johnson (1975) originally proved 3-Partition to be NP-complete, by a reduction from 3-dimensional matching. The classic reference by Garey and Johnson (1979) describes an NP-completeness proof, reducing from 3-dimensional matching to 4-partition to 3-partition. Logically, the reduction can be partitioned into several steps.

=== Reduction from 3d-matching to ABCD-partition ===
We are given an instance of E of 3d-matching, containing some m triplets {w_{i},x_{j},y_{k}}, where the vertices are w_{1},...,w_{q} and x_{1},...,x_{q} and y_{1},...,y_{q}. We construct an instance of ABCD-partition with 4*m elements, as follows (where r := 32q):

- For each triplet t = {w_{i},x_{j},y_{k}} in E, the set A contains an element u_{t} = 10r^{4}-kr^{3}-jr^{2}-ir.
- For each triplet t = {w_{i},x_{j},y_{k}} in E, the set B contains w_{it}, C contains x_{jt}, and D contains y_{kt}. So for each of w_{i}, x_{j}, y_{k}, there may be many corresponding elements in B, C, D - one for each triplet in which they appear. We consider one of these elements (denoted by "1") as the "real" one, and the others as "dummy" ones. The element sizes are as follows:
  - w_{i}[1] = 10r^{4}+ir; w_{i}[2..] = 11r^{4}+ir
  - x_{j}[1] = 10r^{4}+jr^{2}; x_{j}[2..] = 11r^{4}+jr^{2}
  - y_{k}[1] = 10r^{4}+kr^{3}; y_{k}[2..] = 8r^{4}+kr^{3}
- The sum of every three "real" elements or every three "dummy" elements is 30r^{4}+ir+jr^{2}+kr^{3}; and if the triplet element is added, the sum is 40r^{4}.
- The threshold for the ABCD-partition instance is T=40r^{4}. Note that the size of each element is in (T/3,T/5).

Given a perfect matching in E, we construct a 4-partition of ABCD as follows:

- For each triplet t= {w_{i},x_{j},y_{k}} in the matching, we construct a 4-set {u_{t}, w_{i}[1], x_{j}[1], y_{k}[1]} .
- For each triplet not in the matching, we construct a similar 4-set, but with the corresponding dummy elements.

In both cases, the sum of the 4-set is 40r^{4} as needed.

Given a partition of ABCD, the sum of each 4-set is 40r^{4}. Therefore, the terms with r, r^{2} and r^{3} must cancel out, and the terms with r^{4} must sum up to 40r^{4}; so the 4-set must contain a triplet and three matching "real" elements, or a triplet and three matching "dummy" elements. From the triplets with the three matching "real" elements, we construct a valid perfect matching in E.

Note that, in the above reduction, the size of each element is polynomial in the input size; hence, this reduction shows that ABCD-partition is strongly NP-hard.

=== Reduction from ABCD-partition to 4-partition ===
Given an instance of ABCD-partition with m elements per set, threshold T, and sum mT, we construct an instance of 4-partition with 4m elements:

- For each element a in A, the corresponding element has size 16a+1;
- For each element b in B, the corresponding element has size 16b+2;
- For each element c in C, the corresponding element has size 16c+4;
- For each element d in D, the corresponding element has size 16d+8.

All in all, the sum is 16mT+15m, and the new threshold is 16T+15.

Every ABCD-partition corresponds naturally to a 4-partition. Conversely, in every 4-partition, the sum modulo 16 is 15, and therefore it must contain exactly one item with size modulo 16 = 1, 2, 4, 8; this corresponds to exactly one item from A, B, C, D, from which we can construct an ABCD-partition.

Using a similar reduction, ABC-partition can be reduced to 3-partition.

=== Reduction from 4-partition to 3-partition ===
We are given an instance A of 4-partition: 4m integers, a_{1},...,a_{4m}, each of which in the range (T/3,T/5), summing up to mT. We construct an instance B of 3-partition as follows:

- For each a_{i} in A, B contains a "regular" element w_{i} = 4*(5T+a_{i})+1. All in all there are 4m regular elements, summing up to 81mT + 4m.
- For each pair of elements a_{i},a_{j} in A, B contains two "pairing" elements: u_{ij} = 4*(6T - a_{i} - a_{j})+2 and u_{ij}' = 4*(5T + a_{i} + a_{j})+2. All in all there are 4m*(4m-1) pairing elements, summing up to (88mT+16m)*(4m-1).
- Additionally, B contains 8m^{2}-3m "filler" elements, with size 20T, and total sum (8m^{2}-3m)*20T.
- All in all, B contains 24m^{2}-3m = 3(8m^{2}-m) elements, with sum (64T+4)*(8m^{2}-m).
- The threshold for the 3-partition instance is 64T+4; note that the sizes of all elements in B are in (16T+1,32T+2).

Given a 4-partition of A, we construct a 3-partition for B as follows:

- For each 4-set {a_{1},a_{2},a_{3},a_{4}} with sum T, we construct a 3-set {w_{1},w_{2},u_{12}} with sum 4*(5T+a_{1}+5T+a_{2}+6T-a_{1}-a_{2})+1+1+2=64T+4 and another 3-set {w_{3},w_{4},u_{12}'} with sum 4*(5T+a_{3}+5T+a_{4}+5T+a_{1}+a_{2})+1+1+2=64T+4. These sets contain all 4m regular elements and 2m matching pairs of pairing elements.
- From the remaining elements, we construct 3-sets {u_{ij},u_{ij}',filler} with sum 4*(6T-a_{i}-a_{j}+5T+a_{i}+a_{j}+5T)+2+2=64T+4.

Conversely, given a 3-partition of B, the sum of each 3-set is a multiple of 4, so it must contain either two regular items and one pairing item, or two pairing items and one filler item:

- If a 3-set contains two pairing items u_{ij}, u_{kl} and one filler item, then the sum of the two pairing items must be 44T+4 = 4*(5T+6T)+2+2, so they must have matching sizes (a_{i}+a_{j}=a_{k}+a_{l}). Therefore, by replacing as needed, we can assume that the two pairing items are in fact u_{ij} and u_{ij}'. Therefore, the remaining pairing items also consist of n matching pairs.
- Therefore, the remaining 3-sets can be partitioned into two groups: n 3-sets containing the items u_{ij}, and n 3-sets containing the items u_{ij}'. In each matching pair of 3-sets, the sum of the two pairing items u_{ij}+u_{ij}' is 44T+4, so the sum of the four regular items is 84T+4. Therefore, from the four regular items, we construct a 4-set in A, with sum T.

== Applications ==
The NP-hardness of 3-partition was used to prove the NP-hardness rectangle packing, as well as of Tetris and some other puzzles, and some job scheduling problems.
