= Pseudo-polynomial time =

Concept in complexity theory

In computational complexity theory, a numeric algorithm runs in pseudo-polynomial time if its running time is bounded from above by a polynomial function of the two variables: the numeric value of the input (the largest integer present in the input) and the length of the input (the number of bits required to represent it).

In general, using a positional number system, the numeric value of the input is exponential in the input length, which is why a pseudo-polynomial time algorithm does not necessarily run in polynomial time with respect to the input length. The distinction between the value of a number and its length is due to positional encoding; if numeric inputs are instead encoded in unary then the length and value are the same.

An NP-complete problem with known pseudo-polynomial time algorithms is called weakly NP-complete. An NP-complete problem is called strongly NP-complete if it is proven that it cannot be solved by a pseudo-polynomial time algorithm unless P = NP. The strong/weak kinds of NP-hardness are defined analogously. Strong NP-completeness of a problem can be established by a pseudo-polynomial transformation from a known strongly NP-complete problem.

== Examples ==
=== Primality testing ===
Consider solving the problem of testing whether a number n is prime by naively checking whether a number in $\{ 2, 3, \dots, \sqrt{n} \}$ divides $n$ evenly. This approach can take up to $\sqrt{n} - 1$ divisions, which is sub-linear in the value of n but exponential in the length of n (which is about $\log(n)$). For example, a number n slightly less than 10,000,000,000 would require up to approximately 100,000 divisions, even though the length of n is only 11 digits. Moreover one can easily write down an input (say, a 300-digit number) for which this algorithm is impractical. Since computational complexity measures difficulty with respect to the length of the (encoded) input, this naive algorithm is actually exponential. It is, however, pseudo-polynomial time.

Contrast this algorithm with a true polynomial numeric algorithm—say, the straightforward algorithm for addition: Adding two 9-digit numbers takes around 9 simple steps, and in general the algorithm is truly linear in the length of the input. Compared with the actual numbers being added (in the billions), the algorithm could be called "pseudo-logarithmic time", though such a term is not standard. Thus, adding 300-digit numbers is not impractical. Similarly, long division is quadratic: an m-digit number can be divided by a n-digit number in $O(mn)$ steps (see Big O notation.)

In the case of primality, it turns out there is a different algorithm for testing whether n is prime (discovered in 2002) that runs in time $O((\log {n})^6)$.

=== Knapsack problem ===
In the knapsack problem, we are given $n$ items with weight $w_i$ and value $v_i$, along with a maximum weight capacity of a knapsack $W$. The goal is to solve the following optimization problem; informally, what's the best way to fit the items into the knapsack to maximize value?

maximize $\sum_{i=1}^n v_i x_i$
subject to $\sum_{i=1}^n w_i x_i \leq W$ and $x_i \in \{0,1\}$.

Solving this problem is NP-hard, so a polynomial time algorithm is impossible unless P = NP. However, an $O(nW)$ time algorithm is possible using dynamic programming; since the number $W$ only needs $\log W$ bits to describe, this algorithm runs in pseudo-polynomial time.

== Strong and weak NP-hardness vs. strong and weak polynomial-time algorithms ==
Assuming P ≠ NP, the following are true for computational problems on integers:

- If a problem is weakly NP-hard, then it does not have a weakly polynomial time algorithm (polynomial in the number of integers and the number of bits in the largest integer), but it may have a pseudopolynomial time algorithm (polynomial in the number of integers and the magnitude of the largest integer). An example is the partition problem. Both weak NP-hardness and weak polynomial-time correspond to encoding the input integers in binary coding.
- If a problem is strongly NP-hard, then it does not even have a pseudo-polynomial time algorithm. It also does not have a fully-polynomial time approximation scheme. An example is the 3-partition problem. Both strong NP-hardness and pseudo-polynomial time correspond to encoding the input integers in unary coding.

== See also ==
- Strongly NP-complete
- Quasi-polynomial time
- Pseudo-polynomial transformation
