= FFD =

FFD may refer to:

== Arts and entertainment ==
- Fall for Dance Festival, in New York City
- Fat Freddy's Drop, a New Zealand band

== Businesses ==
- FF Developments, a British transmission engineering company
- Final Frontier Design, an American spacesuit developer

== Government and politics ==
- Forum for Democracy and Development, a Zambian political party
- Fresno Fire Department, in California, US

== Places ==
- Fairfield railway station, Melbourne (Station code: FFD), Australia
- Freshford railway station (Station code: FFD), Somerset, England
- RAF Fairford (IATA code: FFD), a military airfield in England

== Science and technology ==
- Finite factorization domain, a particular kind of atomic domain
- Flame failure device, for gas appliances
- Flange focal distance, for an interchangeable lens camera
- Focus film distance, in projectional radiography
- Forward flank downdraft, or front flank downdraft
- Free-form deformation, in computer graphics
- Front focal distance, in optics
- First-fit-decreasing bin packing, an algorithm for bin packing
