= Separation oracle =

Black-box description of a convex set

A separation oracle (also called a cutting-plane oracle) is a concept in the mathematical theory of convex optimization. It is a method to describe a convex set that is given as an input to an optimization algorithm. Separation oracles are used as input to ellipsoid methods.

== Definition ==
Let K be a convex and compact set in R^{n}. A strong separation oracle for K is an oracle (black box) that, given a vector y in R^{n}, returns one of the following:

- Assert that y is in K.
- Find a hyperplane that separates y from K: a vector a in R^{n}, such that $a\cdot y > a\cdot x$ for all x in K.

A strong separation oracle is completely accurate, and thus may be hard to construct. For practical reasons, a weaker version is considered, which allows for small errors in the boundary of K and the inequalities. Given a small error tolerance d>0, we say that:

- A vector y is d-near K if its Euclidean distance from K is at most d;
- A vector y is d-deep in K if it is in K, and its Euclidean distance from any point in outside K is at least d.

The weak version also considers rational numbers, which have a representation of finite length, rather than arbitrary real numbers. A weak separation oracle for K is an oracle that, given a vector y in Q^{n} and a rational number d>0, returns one of the following:

- Assert that y is d-near K;
- Find a vector a in Q^{n}, normalized such that its maximum element is 1, such that $a\cdot y +d\geq a\cdot x$ for all x that are d-deep in K.

== Implementation ==
A special case of a convex set is a set represented by linear inequalities: $K = \{x | Ax \leq b \}$. Such a set is called a convex polytope. A strong separation oracle for a convex polytope can be implemented, but its run-time depends on the input format.

=== Representation by inequalities ===
If the matrix A and the vector b are given as input, so that $K = \{x | Ax \leq b \}$, then a strong separation oracle can be implemented as follows. Given a point y, compute $Ay$:

- If the outcome is at most $b$, then y is in K by definition;
- Otherwise, there is at least one row $c$ of A, such that $c\cdot y$ is larger than the corresponding value in $b$; this row $c$ gives us the separating hyperplane, as $c\cdot y > b \geq c\cdot x$ for all x in K.

This oracle runs in polynomial time as long as the number of constraints is polynomial.

=== Representation by vertices ===
Suppose the set of vertices of K is given as an input, so that $K = \text{conv}(v_1,\ldots,v_k) =$ the convex hull of its vertices. Then, deciding whether y is in K requires to check whether y is a convex combination of the input vectors, that is, whether there exist coefficients z_{1},...,z_{k} such that:

- $z_1\cdot v_1 + \cdots + z_k\cdot v_k = y$;
- $0 \leq z_i\leq 1$ for all i in 1,...,k.

This is a linear program with k variables and n equality constraints (one for each element of y). If y is not in K, then the above program has no solution, and the separation oracle needs to find a vector c such that

- $c\cdot y > c\cdot v_i$ for all i in 1,...,k.

Note that the two above representations can be very different in size: it is possible that a polytope can be represented by a small number of inequalities, but has exponentially many vertices (for example, an n-dimensional cube). Conversely, it is possible that a polytope has a small number of vertices, but requires exponentially many inequalities (for example, the convex hull of the 2n vectors of the form (0,...,±1,...,0).

=== Problem-specific representation ===
In some linear optimization problems, even though the number of constraints is exponential, one can still write a custom separation oracle that works in polynomial time. Some examples are:

- The minimum-cost arborescence problem: given a weighted directed graph and a vertex r in it, find a subgraph of minimum cost that contains a directed path from r to any other vertex. The problem can be presented as an LP with a constraint for each subset of vertices, which is an exponential number of constraints. However, a separation oracle can be implemented using n-1 applications of the minimum cut procedure.
- The maximum independent set problem. It can be approximated by an LP with a constraint for every odd-length cycle. While there are exponentially-many such cycles, a separation oracle that works in polynomial time can be implemented by just finding an odd cycle of minimum length, which can be done in polynomial time.
- The dual of the configuration linear program for the bin packing problem. It can be approximated by an LP with a constraint for each feasible configuration. While there are exponentially-many such cycles, a separation oracle that works in pseudopolynomial time can be implemented by solving a knapsack problem. This is used by the Karmarkar-Karp bin packing algorithms.

=== Non-linear sets ===
Let f be a convex function on R^{n}. The set $K = \{(x, t) | f(x)\leq t \}$ is a convex set in R^{n+1}. Given an evaluation oracle for f (a black box that returns the value of f for every given point), one can easily check whether a vector (y, t) is in K. In order to get a separation oracle, we need also an oracle to evaluate the subgradient of f. Suppose some vector (y, s) is not in K, so f(y) > s. Let g be the subgradient of f at y (g is a vector in R^{n}). Denote $c := (g, -1)$.Then, $c\cdot (y,s) = g\cdot y - s > g\cdot y - f(y)$, and for all (x, t) in K: $c\cdot (x,t) = g\cdot x - t \leq g\cdot x - f(x)$. By definition of a subgradient: $f(x)\geq f(y) + g\cdot (x-y)$ for all x in R^{n}. Therefore, $g\cdot y - f(y) \geq g\cdot x-f(x)$, so $c\cdot(y,s) > c\cdot(x,t)$ , and c represents a separating hyperplane.

== Usage ==
A strong separation oracle can be given as an input to the ellipsoid method for solving a linear program. Consider the linear program $\text{maximize}~~ c\cdot x ~~\text{subject to}~~ Ax \leq b, x\geq 0$. The ellipsoid method maintains an ellipsoid that initially contains the entire feasible domain $A x \leq b$. At each iteration t, it takes the center $x_t$ of the current ellipsoid, and sends it to the separation oracle:

- If the oracle says that $x_t$ is feasible (that is, contained in the set $Ax \leq b$), then we do an "optimality cut" at $x_t$: we cut from the ellipsoid all points x for which $c \cdot x < c \cdot x_t$. These points are definitely not optimal.
- If the oracle says that $x_t$ is infeasible, then it typically returns a specific constraint that is violated by $x_t$, that is, a row $a_j$ in the matrix A, such that $a_j\cdot x_t > b_j$. Since $a_j \cdot x \leq b_j$ for all feasible x, this implies that $a_j\cdot x_t > a_j\cdot x$ for all feasible x. Then, we do a "feasibility cut" at $x_t$: we cut from the ellipsoid all points y for which $a_j\cdot y > a_j\cdot x_t$. These points are definitely not feasible.

After making a cut, we construct a new, smaller ellipsoid, that contains the remaining region. It can be shown that this process converges to an approximate solution, in time polynomial in the required accuracy.

== Converting a weak oracle to a strong oracle ==
Given a weak separation oracle for a polyhedron, it is possible to construct a strong separation oracle by a careful method of rounding, or by diophantine approximations.

== See also ==
- Algorithmic problems on convex sets
