= Susan Assmann =

American mathematician and statistician

Susan Fera Assmann (June 26, 1956 – May 30, 2020) was an American mathematician and statistician. Her research in mathematics included work on the bin covering problem (a discrete optimization problem), while her later work in statistics and biostatistics included work on subgroup analysis and on the use of spironolactone for treating heart failure.

== Early life, education, and career ==
Assmann is originally from Princeton, New Jersey, where she was born on June 26, 1956. Her father, Frederick Fera Assmann (1915–2004) was a chemical engineer for the US Army and Thiokol Chemical Corporation; her mother, Mary Assmann (died 2010), was a science teacher at The Pennington School. In her doctoral dissertation, Susan Assmann writes that her interest in mathematics "was sparked by the 'interesting test' which constituted part of the application for entrance to the Hampshire College Summer Studies in Mathematics program", a summer program for high school mathematics students.

She was the 1974 valedictorian at Hopewell Valley Central High School in Pennington, New Jersey, and a 1978 summa cum laude graduate of Dartmouth College. She completed a Ph.D. in mathematics in 1983 at the Massachusetts Institute of Technology, with the dissertation Problems in Discrete and Applied Mathematics supervised by Daniel Kleitman. Through her joint publications with Kleitman on problems including the bin covering problem, she has Erdős number 2.

After continuing in academia as a mathematics professor at the University of Massachusetts Lowell and Regis College, Assmann came to work for the New England Research Institute (later known as HealthCore), where she continued as a principal statistician for nearly 26 years. Supporting the corresponding shift in her research interests, she received a master's degree in biostatistics from the School of Public Health & Health Sciences at the University of Massachusetts Amherst in 1994.

== Personal life ==
Assmann married Jeffrey Del Papa, a private equity manager. Her interests included change ringing and early harpsichord music.

Assmann died of cancer on May 30, 2020.

== Selected publications ==
- Assmann, S. F.; Peck, G. W.; Sysło, M. M.; Zak, J. (1981), "The bandwidth of caterpillars with hairs of length 1 and 2", SIAM Journal on Algebraic and Discrete Methods, 2 (4): 387–393, doi:10.1137/0602041, MR 0634362
- Assmann, S. F.; Johnson, D. S.; Kleitman, D. J.; Leung, J.Y.-T. (December 1984), "On a dual version of the one-dimensional bin packing problem", Journal of Algorithms, 5 (4): 502–525, doi:10.1016/0196-6774(84)90004-x
- Assmann, Susan F.; Hosmer, David W.; Lemeshow, Stanley; Mundt, Kenneth A. (May 1996), "Confidence intervals for measures of interaction", Epidemiology, 7 (3): 286–290, doi:10.1097/00001648-199605000-00012, JSTOR 3702864, PMID 8728443
- Assmann, Susan F.; Pocock, Stuart J.; Enos, Laura E.; Kasten, Linda E. (March 2000), "Subgroup analysis and other (mis)uses of baseline data in clinical trials", The Lancet, 355 (9209): 1064–1069, doi:10.1016/s0140-6736(00)02039-0, PMID 10744093
- Pitt, Bertram; Pfeffer, Marc A.; Assmann, Susan F.; Boineau, Robin; Anand, Inder S.; Claggett, Brian; Clausell, Nadine; Desai, Akshay S.; Diaz, Rafael; Fleg, Jerome L.; Gordeev, Ivan; Harty, Brian; Heitner, John F.; Kenwood, Christopher T.; Lewis, Eldrin F.; O'Meara, Eileen; Probstfield, Jeffrey L.; Shaburishvili, Tamaz; Shah, Sanjiv J.; Solomon, Scott D.; Sweitzer, Nancy K.; Yang, Song; McKinlay, Sonja M. (April 2014), "Spironolactone for heart failure with preserved ejection fraction", New England Journal of Medicine, 370 (15), Massachusetts Medical Society: 1383–1392, doi:10.1056/nejmoa1313731, PMID 24716680
