= Best-fit bin packing =

Online algorithm for bin packing

Best-fit is an online algorithm for bin packing. Its input is a list of items of different sizes. Its output is a packing - a partition of the items into bins of fixed capacity, such that the sum of sizes of items in each bin is at most the capacity. Ideally, we would like to use as few bins as possible, but minimizing the number of bins is an NP-hard problem. The best-fit algorithm uses the following heuristic:

- It keeps a list of open bins, which is initially empty.
- When an item arrives, it finds the bin with the maximum load into which the item can fit, if any. The load of a bin is defined as the sum of sizes of existing items in the bin before placing the new item.
  - If such a bin is found, the new item is placed inside it.
  - Otherwise, a new bin is opened and the coming item is placed inside it.

== Approximation ratio ==
Denote by BF(L) the number of bins used by Best-Fit, and by OPT(L) the optimal number of bins possible for the list L. The analysis of BF(L) was done in several steps.

- The first upper bound of $BF(L) \leq 1.7\mathrm{OPT}+3$ was proven by Ullman in 1971.
- An improved upper bound $BF(L) \leq 1.7\mathrm{OPT}+2$ was proved by Garey, Graham and Ullman, Johnson and Demers.
- Afterward, it was improved by Garey, Graham, Johnson, Ullman, Yao and Chi-Chih to $BF(L) \leq \lceil 1.7\mathrm{OPT}\rceil$.
- Finally this bound was improved to $BF(L) \leq \lfloor 1.7\mathrm{OPT}\rfloor$ by Dósa and Sgall. They also present an example input list $L$, for that $BF(L)$ matches this bound.

== Worst-fit ==
Worst-Fit is a "dual" algorithm to best-fit: it tries to put the next item in the bin with minimum load.

This algorithm can behave as badly as Next-Fit, and will do so on the worst-case list for that $NF(L) = 2 \cdot \mathrm{OPT}(L) -2$. Furthermore, it holds that $R_{WF}^{\infty}(\text{size}\leq \alpha) = R_{NF}^{\infty}(\text{size}\leq \alpha)$.

Since Worst-Fit is an AnyFit-algorithm, there exists an AnyFit-algorithm such that $R_{AF}^{\infty}(\alpha) = R_{NF}^{\infty}(\alpha)$.
