= Unrelated-machines scheduling =

Optimization problem in computer science and operations research

Unrelated-machines scheduling is an optimization problem in computer science and operations research. It is a variant of optimal job scheduling. We need to schedule n jobs J_{1}, J_{2}, ..., J_{n} on m different machines, such that a certain objective function is optimized (usually, the makespan should be minimized). The time that machine i needs in order to process job j is denoted by p_{i,j}. The term unrelated emphasizes that there is no relation between values of p_{i,j} for different i and j. This is in contrast to two special cases of this problem: uniform-machines scheduling - in which p_{i,j} = p_{i} / s_{j} (where s_{j} is the speed of machine j), and identical-machines scheduling - in which p_{i,j} = p_{i} (the same run-time on all machines).

In the standard three-field notation for optimal job scheduling problems, the unrelated-machines variant is denoted by R in the first field. For example, the problem denoted by " R||$C_\max$" is an unrelated-machines scheduling problem with no constraints, where the goal is to minimize the maximum completion time.

In some variants of the problem, instead of minimizing the maximum completion time, it is desired to minimize the average completion time (averaged over all n jobs); it is denoted by R||$\sum C_i$. More generally, when some jobs are more important than others, it may be desired to minimize a weighted average of the completion time, where each job has a different weight. This is denoted by R||$\sum w_i C_i$.

In a third variant, the goal is to maximize the minimum completion time, " R||$C_\min$" . This variant corresponds to the problem of Egalitarian item allocation.

== Algorithms ==
=== Minimizing the maximum completion time (makespan) ===
Minimizing the maximum completion time is NP-hard even for identical machines, by reduction from the partition problem.

Horowitz and Sahni presented:

- Exact dynamic programming algorithms for minimizing the maximum completion time on both uniform and unrelated machines. These algorithms run in exponential time (recall that these problems are all NP-hard).
- Polynomial-time approximation schemes, which for any ε>0, attain at most (1+ε)OPT. For minimizing the maximum completion time on two uniform machines, their algorithm runs in time $O(10^{2l} n)$, where $l$ is the smallest integer for which $\epsilon \geq 2\cdot 10^{-l}$. Therefore, the run-time is in $O( n / \epsilon^2)$, so it is an FPTAS. For minimizing the maximum completion time on two unrelated machines, the run-time is $O(10^{l} n^2)$ = $O( n^2 / \epsilon)$. They claim that their algorithms can be easily extended for any number of uniform machines, but do not analyze the run-time in this case.

Lenstra, Shmoys and Tardos presented a polytime 2-factor approximation algorithm, and proved that no polytime algorithm with approximation factor smaller than 3/2 is possible unless P=NP. Closing the gap between the 2 and the 3/2 is a long-standing open problem.

Verschae and Wiese presented a different 2-factor approximation algorithm.

Glass, Potts and Shade compare various local search techniques for minimizing the makespan on unrelated machines. Using computerized simulations, they find that tabu search and simulated annealing perform much better than genetic algorithms.

=== Minimizing the average completion time ===
Bruno, Coffman and Sethi present an algorithm, running in time $O(\max(m n^2,n^3))$, for minimizing the average job completion time on unrelated machines, R||$\sum C_j$ (the average over all jobs, of the time it takes to complete the jobs).

Minimizing the weighted average completion time, R||$\sum w_j C_j$ (where w_{j} is the weight of job j), is NP-hard even on identical machines, by reduction from the knapsack problem. It is NP-hard even if the number of machines is fixed and at least 2, by reduction from the partition problem.

Schulz and Skutella present a (3/2+ε)-approximation algorithm using randomized rounding. Their algorithm is a (2+ε)-approximation for the problem with job release times, R|$r_j$|$\sum w_j C_j$.

=== Maximizing the profit ===
Bar-Noy, Bar-Yehuda, Freund, Naor and Schieber consider a setting in which, for each job and machine, there is a profit for running this job on that machine. They present a 1/2 approximation for discrete input and (1-ε)/2 approximation for continuous input.

=== Maximizing the minimum completion time ===
Suppose that, instead of "jobs" we have valuable items, and instead of "machines" we have people. Person i values item j at p_{i,j}. We would like to allocate the items to the people, such that the least-happy person is as happy as possible. This problem is equivalent to unrelated-machines scheduling in which the goal is to maximize the minimum completion time. It is better known by the name egalitarian or max-min item allocation.

== Linear programming formulation ==
A natural way to formulate the problem as a linear program is called the Lenstra–Shmoys–Tardos linear program (LST LP). For each machine i and job j_{,} define a variable $z_{i,j}$, which equals 1 if machine i processes job j, and 0 otherwise. Then, the LP constraints are:

- $\sum_{i=1}^m z_{i,j} = 1$ for every job j in 1,...,n;
- $\sum_{j=1}^n z_{i,j}\cdot p_{i,j} \leq T$ for every machine i in 1,...,m;
- $z_{i,j} \in \{0,1\}$ for every i, j.

Relaxing the integer constraints gives a linear program with size polynomial in the input. Solving the relaxed problem can be rounded to obtain a 2-approximation to the problem.

Another LP formulation is the configuration linear program. For each machine i, there are finitely many subsets of jobs that can be processed by machine i in time at most T. Each such subset is called a configuration for machine i. Denote by C_{i}(T) the set of all configurations for machine i. For each machine i and configuration c in C_{i}(T), define a variable $x_{i,c}$ which equals 1 if the actual configuration used in machine i is c, and 0 otherwise. Then, the LP constraints are:

- $\sum_{c\in C_i(T)}x_{i,c} = 1$ for every machine i in 1,...,m;
- $\sum_{i=1}^m \sum_{c\ni j, c\in C_i(T)}x_{i,c} = 1$ for every job j in 1,...,n;
- $x_{i,j} \in \{0,1\}$ for every i, j.

Note that the number of configurations is usually exponential in the size of the problem, so the size of the configuration LP is exponential. However, in some cases it is possible to bound the number of possible configurations, and therefore find an approximate solution in polynomial time.

== Special cases ==
There is a special case in which p_{i,j} is either 1 or infinity. In other words, each job can be processed on a subset of allowed machines, and its run-time in each of these machines is 1. This variant is sometimes denoted by " P|p_{j}=1,M_{j}|$C_\max$". It can be solved in polynomial time.

== Extensions ==
Kim, Kim, Jang and Chen extend the problem by allowing each job to have a setup time, which depends on the job but not on the machine. They present a solution using simulated annealing. Vallada and Ruiz present a solution using a genetic algorithm.

Nisan and Ronen in their 1999 paper on algorithmic mechanism design. extend the problem in a different way, by assuming that the jobs are owned by selfish agents. See Truthful job scheduling for more details and follow-up works.
