= Heft =

Heft or HEFT may refer to:

- Heart of England NHS Foundation Trust, a health service body in England
- Heterogeneous Earliest Finish Time, a scheduling algorithm
- High-Energy Focusing Telescope, an experiment in X-ray astronomy
- Homestead Extension of Florida's Turnpike, a road in the United States
- Heft or hefting, see Glossary of sheep husbandry#G–K

== People with the surname Heft ==
- Dolores Heft (born 1934), American actress better known as Dolores Dorn
- James Lewis Heft, an American professor
- Muhammad Robert Heft (born 1972), Canadian Muslim activist and writer
- Robert G. Heft (1941–2009), designer of the 50-star and 51-star versions of the U.S. flag
