= Partition matroid =

Direct sum of uniform matroids

For the bipartite graph shown on the left, each vertex in the first column is assigned a unique color. Then, each edge is colored based on which colored vertex it is connected to. Each independent set in the matroid on the right is allowed a maximum of 1 edge of each color. Thus, the matroid is a partition matroid with $|C_i| = 3$ and $d_i = 1$ for all $i$. The latter condition means this matroid is also a transversal matroid.

In mathematics, a partition matroid or partitional matroid is a matroid that is a direct sum of uniform matroids. It is defined over a base set in which the elements are partitioned into different categories. For each category, there is a capacity constraint - a maximum number of allowed elements from this category. The independent sets of a partition matroid are exactly the sets in which, for each category, the number of elements from this category is at most the category capacity.

== Formal definition ==
Let $C_i$ be a collection of disjoint sets ("categories"). Let $d_i$ be integers with $0\le d_i\le |C_i|$ ("capacities"). Define a subset $I\subseteq \bigcup_i C_i$ to be "independent" when, for every index $i$, $|I\cap C_i|\le d_i$. The sets satisfying this condition form the independent sets of a matroid, called a partition matroid.

The sets $C_i$ are called the categories or the blocks of the partition matroid.

A basis of the partition matroid is a set whose intersection with every block $C_i$ has size exactly $d_i$. A circuit of the matroid is a subset of a single block $C_i$ with size exactly $d_i+1$. The rank of the matroid is $\sum d_i$.

Every uniform matroid $U{}^r_n$ is a partition matroid, with a single block $C_1$ of $n$ elements and with $d_1=r$. Every partition matroid is the direct sum of a collection of uniform matroids, one for each of its blocks.

In some publications, the notion of a partition matroid is defined more restrictively, with every $d_i=1$. The partitions that obey this more restrictive definition are the transversal matroids of the family of disjoint sets given by their blocks.

== Properties ==
As with the uniform matroids they are formed from, the dual matroid of a partition matroid is also a partition matroid, and every minor of a partition matroid is also a partition matroid. Direct sums of partition matroids are partition matroids as well.

== Matching ==
A maximum matching in a graph is a set of edges that is as large as possible subject to the condition that no two edges share an endpoint. In a bipartite graph with bipartition $(U,V)$, the sets of edges satisfying the condition that no two edges share an endpoint in $U$ are the independent sets of a partition matroid with one block per vertex in $U$ and with each of the numbers $d_i$ equal to one. The sets of edges satisfying the condition that no two edges share an endpoint in $V$ are the independent sets of a second partition matroid. Therefore, the bipartite maximum matching problem can be represented as a matroid intersection of these two matroids.

More generally the matchings of a graph may be represented as an intersection of two matroids if and only if every odd cycle in the graph is a triangle containing two or more degree-two vertices.

== Clique complexes ==
A clique complex is a family of sets of vertices of a graph $G$ that induce complete subgraphs of $G$. A clique complex forms a matroid if and only if $G$ is a complete multipartite graph, and in this case the resulting matroid is a partition matroid. The clique complexes are exactly the set systems that can be formed as intersections of families of partition matroids for which every $d_i=1$.

== Enumeration ==
The number of distinct partition matroids that can be defined over a set of $n$ labeled elements, for $n=0,1,2,\dots$, is

1, 2, 5, 16, 62, 276, 1377, 7596, 45789, 298626, 2090910, ... (sequence A005387 in the OEIS).

The exponential generating function of this sequence is $f(x)=\exp(e^x(x-1)+2x+1)$.
