= Exact algorithm =

In computer science and operations research, exact algorithms are algorithms that always solve an optimization problem to optimality.

Unless P = NP, an exact algorithm for an NP-hard optimization problem cannot run in worst-case polynomial time. There has been extensive research on finding exact algorithms whose running time is exponential with a low base.

== See also ==
- Approximation-preserving reduction
- APX is the class of problems with some constant-factor approximation algorithm
- Heuristic algorithm
- PTAS - a type of approximation algorithm that takes the approximation ratio as a parameter
