= Optimal job scheduling =

Optimization problem

Optimal job scheduling is a class of optimization problems related to scheduling. The inputs to such problems are a list of jobs (also called processes or tasks) and a list of machines (also called processors or workers). The required output is a schedule – an assignment of jobs to machines. The schedule should optimize a certain objective function. In the literature, problems of optimal job scheduling are often called machine scheduling, processor scheduling, multiprocessor scheduling, load balancing, or just scheduling.

There are many different problems of optimal job scheduling, different in the nature of jobs, the nature of machines, the restrictions on the schedule, and the objective function. A convenient notation for optimal scheduling problems was introduced by Ronald Graham, Eugene Lawler, Jan Karel Lenstra and Alexander Rinnooy Kan. It consists of three fields: α, β and γ. Each field may be a comma separated list of words. The α field describes the machine environment, β the job characteristics and constraints, and γ the objective function. Since its introduction in the late 1970s the notation has been constantly extended, sometimes inconsistently. As a result, today there are some problems that appear with distinct notations in several papers.

== Single-stage jobs vs. multi-stage jobs ==
In the simpler optimal job scheduling problems, each job j consists of a single execution phase, with a given processing time p_{j}. In more complex variants, each job consists of several execution phases, which may be executed in sequence or in parallel.

== Machine environments ==
In single-stage job scheduling problems, there are four main categories of machine environments:

- 1: Single-machine scheduling. There is a single machine.
- P: Identical-machines scheduling. There are $m$ parallel machines, and they are identical. Job $j$ takes time $p_{j}$ on any machine it is scheduled to.
- Q: Uniform-machines scheduling. There are $m$ parallel machines, and they have different given speeds. Job $j$ on machine $i$ takes time $p_{j} / s_i$.
- R: Unrelated-machines scheduling. There are $m$ parallel machines, and they are unrelated – Job $j$ on machine $i$ takes time $p_{ij}$.

These letters might be followed by the number of machines, which is then fixed. For example, P2 indicates that there are two parallel identical machines. Pm indicates that there are m parallel identical machines, where m is a fixed parameter. In contrast, P indicates that there are m parallel identical machines, but m is not fixed (it is part of the input).

In multi-stage job scheduling problems, there are other options for the machine environments:

- O: Open-shop problem. Every job $j$ consists of $m$ operations $O_{ij}$ for $i=1,\ldots,m$. The operations can be scheduled in any order. Operation $O_{ij}$ must be processed for $p_{ij}$ units on machine $i$.
- F: Flow-shop problem. Every job $j$ consists of $m$ operations $O_{ij}$ for $i=1,\ldots,m$, to be scheduled in the given order. Operation $O_{ij}$ must be processed for $p_{ij}$ units on machine $i$.
- J: Job-shop problem. Every job $j$ consists of $n_j$ operations $O_{kj}$ for $k=1,\ldots,n_j$, to be scheduled in that order. Operation $O_{kj}$ must be processed for $p_{kj}$ units on a dedicated machine $\mu_{kj}$ with $\mu_{kj}\neq \mu_{k'j}$ for $k\neq k'$.

== Job characteristics ==
All processing times are assumed to be integers. In some older research papers however they are assumed to be rationals.

- $p_i=p$, or $p_{ij}=p$: the processing time is equal for all jobs.
- $p_i=1$, or $p_{ij}=1$: the processing time is equal to 1 time-unit for all jobs.
- $r_j$: for each job a release time is given before which it cannot be scheduled, default is 0.
- $\text{online-}r_j$: an online problem. Jobs are revealed at their release times. See online job scheduling.
- $d_j$: for each job a due date is given. The idea is that every job should complete before its due date and there is some penalty for jobs that complete late. This penalty is denoted in the objective value. The presence of the job characteristic $d_j$ is implicitly assumed and not denoted in the problem name, unless there are some restrictions as for example $d_j=d$, assuming that all due dates are equal to some given date.
- $\bar d_j$: for each job a strict deadline is given. Every job must complete before its deadline.
- pmtn: Jobs can be preempted and resumed possibly on another machine. Sometimes also denoted by 'prmp'.
- $\text{size}_j$: Each job comes with a number of machines on which it must be scheduled at the same time. The default is 1. This is an important parameter in the variant called parallel task scheduling.

=== Precedence relations ===
Each pair of two jobs may or may not have a precedence relation. A precedence relation between two jobs means that one job must be finished before the other job. For example, if job i is a predecessor of job j in that order, job j can only start once job i is completed.

- prec: There are no restrictions placed on the precedence relations.
- chains: Each job is the predecessor of at most one other job and is preceded by at most one other job.
- tree: The precedence relations must satisfy one of the two restrictions.
  - intree: Each node is the predecessor of at most one other job.
  - outtree: Each node is preceded by at most one other job.
- opposing forest: If the graph of precedence relations is split into connected components, then each connected component is either an intree or outtree.
- sp-graph: The graph of precedence relations is a series parallel graph.
- bounded height: The length of the longest directed path is capped at a fixed value. (A directed path is a sequence of jobs where each job except the last is a predecessor of the next job in the sequence.)
- level order: Each job has a level, which is the length of the longest directed path starting from that job. Each job with level $k$ is a predecessor of every job with level $k-1$.
- interval order: Each job $x$ has an interval [s_{x},e_{x}) and job $x$ is a predecessor of $y$ if and only if the end of the interval of $x$ is strictly less than the start of the interval for $y$.=

In the presence of a precedence relation one might in addition assume time lags. The time lag between two jobs is the amount of time that must be waited after the first job is complete before the second job to begin. Formally, if job i precedes job j, then $C_i + \ell_{ij} \leq S_j$ must be true. If no time lag $\ell_{ij}$ is specified then it is assumed to be zero. Time lags can also be negative. A negative time lag means that the second job can begin a fixed time before the first job finishes.

- ℓ: The time lag is the same for each pair of jobs.
- $\ell_{ij}$: Different pairs of jobs can have different time lags.

=== Transportation delays ===
- $t_{jk}$: Between the completion of operation $O_{kj}$ of job $j$ on machine $k$ and the start of operation $O_{k+1,j}$ of job $j$ on machine $k+1$, there is a transportation delay of at least $t_{jk}$ units.
- $t_{jkl}$: Between the completion of operation $O_{kj}$ of job $j$ on machine $k$ and the start of operation $O_{l,j}$ of job $j$ on machine $l$, there is a transportation delay of at least $t_{jkl}$ units.
- $t_k$: Machine dependent transportation delay. Between the completion of operation $O_{kj}$ of job $j$ on machine $k$ and the start of operation $O_{k+1,j}$ of job $j$ on machine $k+1$, there is a transportation delay of at least $t_{k}$ units.
- $t_{kl}$: Machine pair dependent transportation delay. Between the completion of operation $O_{kj}$ of job $j$ on machine $k$ and the start of operation $O_{l,j}$ of job $j$ on machine $l$, there is a transportation delay of at least $t_{kl}$ units.
- $t_j$: Job dependent transportation delay. Between the completion of operation $O_{kj}$ of job $j$ on machine $k$ and the start of operation $O_{l,j}$ of job $j$ on machine $l$, there is a transportation delay of at least $t_{j}$ units.

=== Various constraints ===
- rcrc: Also known as Recirculation or flexible job shop. The promise on $\mu$ is lifted and for some pairs $k\neq k'$ we might have $\mu_{kj}= \mu_{k'j}$. In other words, it is possible for different operations of the same job to be assigned to the same machine.
- no-wait: The operation $O_{k+1,i}$ must start exactly when operation $O_{k,i}$ completes. In other words, once one operation of a job finishes, the next operation must begin immediately. Sometimes also denoted as 'nwt'.
- no-idle: No machine may ever be idle between the start of its first execution to the end of its last execution.
- $\text{size}_j$: Multiprocessor tasks on identical parallel machines. The execution of job $j$ is done simultaneously on $\text{size}_j$ parallel machines.
- $\text{fix}_j$: Multiprocessor tasks. Every job $j$ is given with a set of machines $\text{fix}_j\subseteq\{1,\ldots,m\}$, and needs simultaneously all these machines for execution. Sometimes also denoted by 'MPT'.
- $M_j$: Multipurpose machines. Every job $j$ needs to be scheduled on one machine out of a given set $M_j\subseteq\{1,\ldots,m\}$. Sometimes also denoted by M_{j}.

== Objective functions ==
Usually the goal is to minimize some objective value. One difference is the notation $\sum U_j$ where the goal is to maximize the number of jobs that complete before their deadline. This is also called the throughput. The objective value can be sum, possibly weighted by some given priority weights $w_j$ per job.

- -: The absence of an objective value is denoted by a single dash. This means that the problem consists simply in producing a feasible scheduling, satisfying all given constraints.
- $C_j$: the completion time of job $j$. $C_{\max}$ is the maximum completion time; also known as the makespan. Sometimes we are interested in the mean completion time (the average of $C_j$ over all j), which is sometimes denoted by mft (mean finish time).
- $F_j$: The flow time of a job is the difference between its completion time and its release time, i.e. $F_j=C_j-r_j$.
- $L_j$: Lateness. Every job $j$ is given a due date $d_j$. The lateness of job $j$ is defined as $C_j-d_j$. Sometimes $L_{\max}$ is used to denote feasibility for a problem with deadlines. Indeed, using binary search, the complexity of the feasibility version is equivalent to the minimization of $L_{\max}$.
- $U_j$: Throughput. Every job is given a due date $d_j$. There is a unit profit for jobs that complete on time, i.e. $U_j=1$ if $C_j\leq d_j$ and $U_j=0$ otherwise. Sometimes the meaning of $U_j$ is inverted in the literature, which is equivalent when considering the decision version of the problem, but which makes a huge difference for approximations.
- $T_j$: Tardiness. Every job $j$ is given a due date $d_j$. The tardiness of job $j$ is defined as $T_j = \max\{0, C_j-d_j\}$.
- $E_j$: Earliness. Every job $j$ is given a due date $d_j$. The earliness of job $j$ is defined as $E_j = \max\{0, d_j-C_j\}$. This objective is important for just-in-time scheduling.

There are also variants with multiple objectives, but they are much less studied.

== Examples ==
Here are some examples for problems defined using the above notation.

- $P_2\parallel C_{\max}$ – assigning each of $n$ given jobs to one of the two identical machines so to minimize the maximum total processing time over the machines. This is an optimization version of the partition problem
- 1|prec|$L_\max$ – assigning to a single machine, processes with general precedence constraint, minimizing maximum lateness.
- R|pmtn|$\sum C_i$ – assigning tasks to a variable number of unrelated parallel machines, allowing preemption, minimizing total completion time.
- J3|$p_{ij}=1$|$C_\max$ – a 3-machine job shop problem with unit processing times, where the goal is to minimize the maximum completion time.
- $P\mid\text{size}_j\mid C_\max$ – assigning jobs to $m$ parallel identical machines, where each job comes with a number of machines on which it must be scheduled at the same time, minimizing maximum completion time. See parallel task scheduling.

== Other variants ==
- All variants surveyed above are deterministic in that all data is known to the planner. There are also stochastic variants, in which the data is not known in advance, or can perturb randomly.
- In a load balancing game, each job belongs to a strategic agent, who can decide where to schedule his job. The Nash equilibrium in this game may not be optimal. Aumann and Dombb assess the inefficiency of equilibrium in several load-balancing games.

== See also ==
- Fractional job scheduling
- Load balancing (computing): optimal load balancing is an alternate term for optimal job scheduling.
