= Franz Alt (mathematician) =

Austrian-American mathematician

- Born: November 30, 1910; Vienna, Austria
- Died: July 21, 2011 (aged 100); New York, New York, United States
- Education: University of Vienna
- Scientific career
- Fields: Mathematics; Computer science
- Academic advisors: Hans Hahn, Karl Menger

Franz Leopold Alt (November 30, 1910 – July 21, 2011) was an Austrian-born American mathematician who made major contributions to computer science in its early days. He was best known as one of the founders of the Association for Computing Machinery, and served as its president from 1950 to 1952.

== Vienna ==
Alt was born in Vienna, Austria, on November 30, 1910, to a secular Jewish family. He received a PhD in mathematics in 1932 from the University of Vienna, with a thesis entitled Metrische Definition der Krümmung einer Kurve ("Metrical Definition of the Curvature of a Curve"). His principal teachers were Hans Hahn and Karl Menger. He was one of the regular participants in, and contributors to, Menger's "Mathematisches Kolloquium." [Afterword, Karl Menger, Ergebnisse eines Mathematischen Kolloquiums, Springer-Verlag/Wien, 1998] Alt engaged in research in set-theoretic topology and logical foundations of geometry.

In addition, in the next few years he became interested in econometrics, stimulated by Oskar Morgenstern, then professor of economics at the University of Vienna, later at Princeton University. In 1936, Alt developed an axiomatic foundation for economic concepts, described in "Ueber die Messbarkeit des Nutzens," which he presented at the International Congress of Mathematicians in Oslo (published in Zeitschrift für Nationalökonomie, VII/2, 1936; in German). The English translation of this paper was published as "On the Measurability of Utility" in Preferences, Utility, and Demand: A Minnesota Symposium (Harcourt Brace Jovanovich, 1971).

== New York ==
Alt left Austria at the time of its occupation by Nazi Germany in 1938 and came to New York City with his wife Alice Modern, whom he married just before leaving Vienna. In the next few years it was their highest priority to save relatives and friends endangered by the Nazi terror in Austria or Germany. This involved finding Americans willing to serve as sponsors for immigration visas, and they were successful in helping about 30 adults and children to escape.

Between 1938 and 1946 Alt worked for six years at the Econometric Institute in New York City, interrupted by two years of service in the United States Army. At the Econometric Institute he served successively as Research Principal and assistant director of Research engaged in the analysis of economic time series by methods such as multiple correlation, used for business forecasting. He was concerned with the use of mathematical and statistical methods for the study and forecasting of business conditions in the economy as a whole and in a number of industries, commodity and security markets. One of the clients advised by Alt was the General Motors Corporation.

== Army – 10th Mountain Division to Aberdeen ==
When the United States entered World War II, he volunteered for military service but was at first rejected as an alien; he was drafted into the Army in 1943. (Citizenship was granted in 1944.) He then served in the elite 10th Mountain Division, trained for skiing, rock climbing and mountain fighting. On the weekends, Alt liked to go out alone or with a friend to ski cross-country or climb the peaks near Camp Hale; his field notes on three of these climbs were published in "Appalachia," the journal of the Appalachian Mountain Club, Summer/Fall 2014. Toward the end of the war he graduated from officers' training as a Second Lieutenant.

While in military service he was assigned to the Army's Aberdeen Proving Ground in 1945, in charge of planning for electronic computation. On discharge from the Army, he returned to the Econometric Institute for one year. As a civilian he returned to Aberdeen in 1946–48, and was Deputy Chief of the Computing Laboratory, which was a general-purpose mathematical service organization operating large digital and analog computing machines, punched card installation, and data reduction facility.

== National Bureau of Standards, Washington, DC ==
As Deputy Chief of the Computation Laboratory (1948–52), then of the Applied Mathematics Division (1952–67), he directed the early use of computers throughout the National Bureau of Standards and elsewhere in the federal government, as well as research in numerical analysis, statistical engineering and some other branches of applied mathematics. From 1959 to 1961, he was one of the editors of the NBS Journal of Research.

For several years he also served as administrator of the Bureau of Standards' program to award research grants in physics and chemistry in India, Pakistan and Israel, where foreign currency (PL 480) available for such purposes had been allocated to the Bureau.

Also during this time, he became interested in the use of computers for automatic translation of languages. This led to the founding of the Association for Computational Linguistics and to the organization of two international meetings jointly with a similar group in Japan, one in Washington, D.C., the other in Tokyo.

== ACM – Association for Computing Machinery ==
Alt has a long history with the Association for Computing Machinery, known as the ACM. He was one of its founders and served as its third president (1950–52). He was editor of its Journal (1954–58). Alt was the first recipient of its Distinguished Service Award (1970). In 1994, he was in the first group to be inducted as a Fellow of the ACM. Alt represented ACM on the National Research Council from 1961 to 1964. He is also a member of the American Mathematical Society, and formerly a member of the American Statistical Association, Institute of Mathematical Statistics, Econometric Society, and Association for Computational Linguistics.

Alt has written and been interviewed about the history of ACM several times. He wrote "Fifteen Years ACM: The development years of ACM, as recounted in 1962 by founding member and former president Franz L. Alt, depicts the players and progress of an organization committed to sharing computing knowledge and skills" (Communications of the ACM, June 1962, Vol.5 #6; reprinted October 1987, Vol. 30 #10).

Alt was interviewed in 1969 by Uta C. Merzbach for the Computer Oral History Collection at the Smithsonian National Museum of American History. Oral History Transcript at Niels Bohr Archives, American Institute of Physics, 24 Feb. And 13 March 1969.

The ACM awarded Franz Alt its first Distinguished Service Award in 1970.

For the 25th anniversary of the founding of ACM, Alt wrote in "Archeology of Computers: Reminiscences, 1945–47" (Communications of the ACM, July 1972, Vol. 15 #7) the following:

We had succeeded in obtaining John von Neumann as keynote speaker [for the first national meeting of the ACM]. He discussed the need for, and likely impact of, electronic computing. He mentioned the "new programming method" for ENIAC and explained that its seemingly small vocabulary was in fact ample; that future computers, then in the design stage, would get along on a dozen instruction types, and this was known to be adequate for expressing all of mathematics ... Von Neumann went on to say that one need not be surprised at this small number, since about 1,000 words were known to be adequate for most situations of real life, and mathematics was only a small part of life, and a very simple part at that. This caused some hilarity in the audience, which provoked von Neumann to say: "If people do not believe that mathematics is simple, it is only because they do not realize how complicated life is."

Alt was interviewed in 1995 by Janet Benton (excerpted as "Franz Alt Remembers the Early Years of Computing and the Creation of ACM," ACMMemberNet Supplement to Communications of the ACM, Feb. 1996, Vol. 39 #2).

For JACM's 50th Anniversary, he contributed "Journal of the ACM–The Beginnings" (Journal of the ACM, Jan. 2003, Vol. 50 #1).

ACM interviewed former presidents, including an interview with Alt by Atsushi Akera in 2006; to access this and much other ACM material by and about Alt, go to acm.org and search "Franz L. Alt"

== American Institute of Physics, New York ==
In 1967, distressed by the war in Vietnam, he left the United States Government for the position of deputy director of the Information Division of the American Institute of Physics in New York. There he was instrumental in establishing a computerized information system on papers in the physics journal literature, including hierarchical classification, subject indexing and a citation index.

== Retirement ==
After his retirement in 1973, he did volunteer work for peace and justice organizations, with an emphasis on work for peace in Southeast Asia and anti-nuclear work, particularly for Clergy and Laity Concerned About Vietnam (1976–91) [Sheila Collins, "A Man for All Seasons: A Tribute to Franz Alt," CALC Report, October 1988]. Throughout he continued to pursue his lifelong hobbies of hiking, climbing and skiing, as well as playing violin and viola in chamber music. Janet Hays interviewed him for her book "Retire in New York City – Even If you′re Not Rich" (Chicago: Bonus Books, 2002). He turned 100 in November 2010.

== Recognitions ==
Alt was interviewed by Reinhard Siegmund-Schultze for his history of German and Austrian mathematicians who fled from Hitler. Mathematiker auf der Flucht vor Hitler: Quellen und Studien zur Emigration einer Wissenschaft, (Deutsche Mathematiker-Vereinigung, 1998). Expanded and translated into English as Mathematicians Fleeing from Nazi Germany: Individual Fates and Global Impact (Princeton University Press, 2009).

In 1998, Alt attended the International Congress of Mathematicians in Berlin as the guest of the Deutsche Mathematiker-Vereinigung (German Mathematical Society) in connection with its exhibition "Terror and Exile: Persecution and Expulsion of Mathematicians from Berlin between 1933–1945."

Die Oesterreichische Mathematische Gesellschaft (the Austrian Mathematical Society) invited him to attend the 2001 joint meeting in Vienna of the German and Austrian mathematical societies in conjunction with the exhibition "Vienna 1938 and the Exodus of Mathematicians." At the opening of the exhibition, he spoke of his recollections

In May 2007, Chancellor Alfred Gusenbauer conferred on Alt the "Ehrenkreuz fuer Wissenschaft und Kunst I. Klasse," the highest distinction for science and art in Austria. In a symposium in the University Dr. Karl Sigmund, professor of mathematics of the University of Vienna, spoke of Alt's place in the history of mathematics in Vienna between the wars. Dr. Walter Schachermayer, then of the Vienna University of Technology, spoke about Alt's paper "On the Measurement of Utility," presented at the International Congress of Mathematicians in Oslo in 1936, and its relation to the work of John von Neumann, Oskar Morgenstern and Kenneth Arrow, and recent developments in the notion of coherent risk measures.

While he was in Vienna in May 2007, Alt spoke to students of his old gymnasium, the Stubenbastei. The school established the Franz Alt Preis in his honor. The prize is awarded in two categories, Science and Mathematics and Human Rights and Justice, for papers written by graduating students, and has been awarded annually since 2008.

On 8 May 2007 Alt received the Austrian Cross of Honour for Science and Art, 1st class.

Paul Brantley has written two string quartets dedicated to Franz Alt, "Esterhazy, Books 1 and 2." Book 1 was premiered by the Flux Quartet on April 27, 2014, in New York City, and Book 2 was premiered by the New Esterhazy Quartet on January 31, 2014, in Palo Alto, California.

== Publications ==
- Electronic Digital Computers: Their Use in Science and Engineering, (New York: Academic Press, 1958) and of numerous technical papers.
- Ed., Advances in Computers, Volumes 1–11 (New York: Academic Press, 1960–70).
- "End-Running Human Intelligence", in Peter J. Denning and Robert M. Metcalfe, eds., Beyond Calculation: The Next Fifty Years of Computing (New York: Springer Verlag, 1997).
