= Nicole Megow =

German mathematician and computer scientist

Nicole Megow is a German discrete mathematician and theoretical computer scientist whose research topics include combinatorial optimization, approximation algorithms, and online algorithms for scheduling. She is a professor in the faculty of mathematics and computer science at the University of Bremen.

== Education and career ==
Megow earned a diploma in mathematical economics from Technische Universität Berlin in 2002, and completed a doctorate (Dr. rer. nat.) from the same university in 2006. Her dissertation, Coping with Incomplete Information in Scheduling, was supervised by Rolf H. Mohring.

After working as a researcher and visiting professor at Technische Universität Berlin, the Max Planck Institute for Informatics, and the Technische Universität Darmstadt, she became an assistant professor at the Technical University of Munich in 2015, and took her present position as professor at the University of Bremen in 2016.

== Recognition ==
Megow was one of the 2013 winners of the Heinz Maier-Leibnitz-Preis.
