= Schedule 7 =

Schedule 7 may refer to:

- Schedule 7, of the UK Terrorism Act 2000
- Schedule 7, of the Drug prohibition law
- Schedule 7, of the Standard for the Uniform Scheduling of Drugs and Poisons

== See also ==
- Schedule (disambiguation)
