= Genetic algorithms in economics =

Genetic algorithms have increasingly been applied to economics since the pioneering work by John H. Miller in 1986. It has been used to characterize a variety of models including the cobweb model, the overlapping generations model, game theory, schedule optimization and asset pricing. Specifically, it has been used as a model to represent learning, rather than as a means for fitting a model.

== Genetic algorithm in the cobweb model ==
The cobweb model is a simple supply and demand model for a good over t periods. Firms (agents) make a production quantity decision in a given period, however their output is not produced until the following period. Thus, the firms are going to have to use some sort of method to forecast what the future price will be. The GA is used as a sort of learning behaviour for the firms. Initially their quantity production decisions are random, however each period they learn a little more. The result is the agents converge within the area of the rational expectations (RATEX) equilibrium for the stable and unstable case. If the election operator is used, the GA converges exactly to the RATEX equilibrium.

There are two types of learning methods these agents can be deployed with: social learning and individual learning. In social learning, each firm is endowed with a single string which is used as its quantity production decision. It then compares this string against other firms' strings. In the individual learning case, agents are endowed with a pool of strings. These strings are then compared against other strings within the agent's population pool. This can be thought of as mutual competing ideas within a firm whereas in the social case, it can be thought of as a firm learning from more successful firms. Note that in the social case and in the individual learning case with identical cost functions, that this is a homogeneous solution, that is all agents' production decisions are identical. However, if the cost functions are not identical, this will result in a heterogeneous solution, where firms produce different quantities (note that they are still locally homogeneous, that is within the firm's own pool all the strings are identical).

After all agents have made a quantity production decision, the quantities are aggregated and plugged into a demand function to get a price. Each firm's profit is then calculated. Fitness values are then calculated as a function of profits. After the offspring pool is generated, hypothetical fitness values are calculated. These hypothetical values are based on some sort of estimation of the price level, often just by taking the previous price level.

== See also ==
- List of genetic algorithm applications § Finance and Economics
