= Scheduling software =

Scheduling software may refer to:

- Appointment scheduling software, for business appointments
- Employee scheduling software
- Job scheduler, for computer program execution

== See also ==
- List of job scheduler software
- Schedule (disambiguation)
- Scheduler (disambiguation)
