= Scheduler (disambiguation) =

Scheduler is a person responsible for making a particular schedule.

Scheduler could also refer to:

- Scheduler (computing)
- Network scheduler, program that manages network queues for transmitting and receiving packets
- Job scheduler, a class of software for controlling unattended background program execution
  - Job shop scheduling, the algorithmic problem of assigning jobs to processors in order to minimize the total makespan
- I/O scheduler, software deciding the order of block I/O operations will be submitted to storage volumes
- Process scheduler, a part of operating system's kernel

== See also ==
- Scheduling software
