= Adaptive expectations =

Formation of expectations based on past events

In economics, adaptive expectations is a hypothesized process by which people form their expectations about what will happen in the future based on what has happened in the past. For example, if people want to create an expectation of the inflation rate in the future, they can refer to past inflation rates to infer some consistencies and could derive a more accurate expectation the more years they consider.

One simple version of adaptive expectations is stated in the following equation, where $p^e$ is the next year's rate of inflation that is currently expected; $p^e_{-1}$ is this year's rate of inflation that was expected last year; and $p$ is this year's actual rate of inflation:

$$p^e = p^{e}_{-1} + \lambda (p - p^{e}_{-1})$$

where $\lambda$ is between 0 and 1. This says that current expectations of future inflation reflect past expectations and an "error-adjustment" term, in which current expectations are raised (or lowered) according to the gap between actual inflation and previous expectations. The error-adjustment term, also called partial adjustment, allows for variations in inflation rates over the previous years, especially years that have abnormally high or low rates.

$$\lambda(p - p^{e}_{-1})$$

The above term is the partial adjustment error term, this term allows for variances that occur between actual values and expected values. The importance of considering the error prevents over and under expecting values of in the above example inflation rates. The adjustment means that the expectation can tend toward the direction of the future expected value that would be closer to the actual value, this allows a prediction to be made and consideration to be added or removed so as to be accurate of the future expectation. This consideration or error term is what allows the predicted value to be adaptable, thus creating an equation that is adaptive of the expectation being inferred.

The theory of adaptive expectations can be applied to all previous periods so that current inflationary expectations equal:

$$p^e_t =  \lambda \sum_{j = 0}^{\infty} (1 - \lambda)^j p_{t-j}$$

where $p_{t-j}$ equals actual inflation $j$ years in the past. The adding of a time series portion to the expectation equations accounts for multiple previous years and their respective rates in forecasting like the above example of the future inflation rate. Thus, current expected inflation reflects a weighted average of all past inflation rates, where the weights get smaller and smaller as we move further in to the past. The initial previous year has the highest weighting and the subsequent years take lesser weighting the further back the equation accounts for.

When an agent makes a forecasting error (as in incorrectly recording a value or mistyping), the stochastic shock will cause the agent to incorrectly forecast the price expectation level again even if the price level experiences no further shocks, since the previous expectations only ever incorporates part of their errors. The backward nature of expectation formulation and the resultant systematic errors made by agents (see cobweb model) had become unsatisfactory to economists such as John Muth, who was pivotal in the development of an alternative model of how expectations are formed, called rational expectations. The use of rational expectations have largely replaced adaptive expectations in macroeconomic theory since its assumptions rely on an optimal expectations approach which is consistent with economic theory. However, it must be stressed that confronting adaptive expectations and rational expectations aren't necessarily justified by either use, in other words, there are situations in which following the adaptive scheme is a rational response.

The first use adaptive expectations hypothesis was to describe agent behavior in The Purchasing Power of Money by Irving Fisher (1911), then later used to describe models such as hyperinflation by Philip Cagan (1956). Adaptive expectations were instrumental in the consumption function (1957) and Phillips curve outlined by Milton Friedman. Friedman suggests that workers form adaptive expectations of the inflation rate, the government can easily surprise them through unexpected monetary policy changes. As agents are trapped by the money illusion, they are unable to correctly perceive price and wage dynamics, so based on Friedman's theory, unemployment can always be reduced through monetary expansions. If the government chooses to fix a low unemployment rate the result is an increasing level of inflation for an extended period of time. However, in this framework, it is clear why and how adaptive expectations are problematic. Agents are arbitrarily supposed to ignore sources of information which, otherwise, would affect their expectations. For example, government announcements are such sources. Agents are expected to modify their expectations and break with the former trends when changes in economic policy necessitate it. This is the reason why the theory of adaptive expectations is often regarded as a deviation from the rational tradition of economics.

== See also ==
- Policy ineffectiveness proposition
- Problem of induction
- Rational expectations
- Self-fulfilling prophecy
- Cobweb model
- Phillips curve
- Consumption function
