= Tardiness (scheduling) =

Measure of delay in executing operations

In scheduling, tardiness is a measure of a delay in executing certain operations and earliness is a measure of finishing operations before due time. The operations may depend on each other and on the availability of equipment to perform them.

Typical examples include job scheduling in manufacturing and data delivery scheduling in data processing networks.

In manufacturing environment, inventory management considers both tardiness and earliness undesirable. Tardiness involves backlog issues such as customer compensation for delays and loss of goodwill. Earliness incurs expenses for storage of the manufactured items and ties up capital.

== Mathematical formulations ==
In an environment with multiple jobs, let the deadline be $d_i$ and the completion time be $C_i$ of job $i$. Then for job $i$

- lateness is $L_i=C_i-d_i$,
- earliness is $E_i = \max(0, d_i-C_i)$,
- tardiness is $T_i = \max(0, C_i-d_i)$.

In scheduling common objective functions are $C_\max, L_\max, E_\max, T_\max, \sum C_i, \sum L_i, \sum E_i, \sum T_i$ or weighted version of these sums, $w_iC_\max, w_iL_\max, w_iE_\max, w_iT_\max, \sum w_iC_i, \sum w_iL_i, \sum w_iE_i, \sum w_iT_i$, where every job comes with a weight $w_i$. The weight is a representation of job cost, priority, etc.

In a large number of cases the problems of optimizing these functions are NP-hard.
