= Cobweb model =

Non-equilibrium model of supply and demand

The cobweb model or cobweb theory is an economic model that explains why prices may be subjected to periodic fluctuations in certain types of markets. It describes cyclical supply and demand in a market where the amount produced must be chosen before prices are observed. Producers' expectations about prices are assumed to be based on observations of previous prices. Nicholas Kaldor analyzed the model in 1934, coining the term "cobweb theorem" (see Kaldor, 1938 and Pashigian, 2008), citing previous analyses in German by Henry Schultz and Umberto Ricci.

== The model ==
The convergent case: each new outcome is successively closer to the intersection of supply and demand.

The divergent case: each new outcome is successively further from the intersection of supply and demand.

The cobweb model is generally based on a time lag between supply and demand decisions. Agricultural markets are a context where the cobweb model might apply, since there is a lag between planting and harvesting (Kaldor, 1934, p. 133–134 gives two agricultural examples: rubber and corn). Suppose for example that as a result of unexpectedly bad weather, farmers go to market with an unusually small crop of strawberries. This shortage, equivalent to a leftward shift in the market's supply curve, results in high prices. If farmers expect these high price conditions to continue, then in the following year, they will raise their production of strawberries relative to other crops. Therefore, when they go to market the supply will be high, resulting in low prices. If they then expect low prices to continue, they will decrease their production of strawberries for the next year, resulting in high prices again.

This process is illustrated by the adjacent diagrams. The equilibrium price is at the intersection of the supply and demand curves. A poor harvest in period 1 means supply falls to Q_{1}, so that prices rise to P_{1}. If producers plan their period 2 production under the expectation that this high price will continue, then the period 2 supply will be higher, at Q_{2}. Prices therefore fall to P_{2} when they try to sell all their output. As this process repeats itself, oscillating between periods of low supply with high prices and then high supply with low prices, the price and quantity trace out a spiral. They may spiral inwards, as in the top figure, in which case the economy converges to the equilibrium where supply and demand cross; or they may spiral outwards, with the fluctuations increasing in magnitude.

The cobweb model can have two types of outcomes:

- If the supply curve is steeper than the demand curve, then the fluctuations decrease in magnitude with each cycle, so a plot of the prices and quantities over time would look like an inward spiral, as shown in the first diagram. This is called the stable or convergent case.
- If the demand curve is steeper than the supply curve, then the fluctuations increase in magnitude with each cycle, so that prices and quantities spiral outwards. This is called the unstable or divergent case.

Two other possibilities are:

- Fluctuations may also maintain a constant magnitude, so a plot of the outcomes would produce a simple rectangle. This happens in the linear case if the supply and demand curves have exactly the same slope (in absolute value).
- If the supply curve is less steep than the demand curve near the point where the two curves cross, but more steep when we move sufficiently far away, then prices and quantities will spiral away from the equilibrium price but will not diverge indefinitely; instead, they may converge to a limit cycle.

In either of the first two scenarios, the combination of the spiral and the supply and demand curves often looks like a cobweb, hence the name of the theory.

The Gori et al. group finds that cobwebs experience Hopf bifurcations, in Gori et al. 2014, Gori et al. 2015a, and Gori et al. 2015b.

In their article, Coase and Fowler (1935) provided a rebuttal of Kaldor's cobweb cycle theorem. Crucial to the cobweb theorem is the assumption that production is the function of last period price. Hence, a high price leads to a big increase in production and an oversupply that then drastically lowers price. In the case of hogs, the production lag is based on the gestation period of female hogs. However, Coase and Fowler argue that farmers do not mechanically base this supply decision up on last periods price, but take into account prices of several years, thus, smoothing out the price upon which the supply decision is based. This will reduce the output volatility. Hence the cobweb cycle implied by Kaldor's model does not apply in practice.

== Elasticities versus slopes ==
When supply and demand are linear functions the outcomes of the cobweb model are stated above in terms of slopes, but they are more commonly described in terms of elasticities. The convergent case requires that the slope of the (inverse) supply curve be greater than the absolute value of the slope of the (inverse) demand curve:

$$\frac{dP^S}{dQ^S} > \left|\frac{dP^D}{dQ^D}\right|.$$

In standard microeconomics terminology, define the elasticity of supply as $\frac{dQ^S/Q^S}{dP^S/P^S}$, and the elasticity of demand as $\frac{dQ^D/Q^D}{dP^D/P^D}$. If we evaluate these two elasticities at the equilibrium point, that is $P^S=P^D=P>0$ and $Q^S=Q^D=Q>0$, then we see that the convergent case requires

$$\frac{dQ^S/Q}{dP^S/P}<\left|\frac{dQ^D/Q}{dP^D/P}\right|,$$

whereas the divergent case requires

$$\frac{dQ^S/Q}{dP^S/P}>\left|\frac{dQ^D/Q}{dP^D/P}\right|.$$

In words, the convergent case occurs when the demand curve is more elastic than the supply curve, at the equilibrium point. The divergent case occurs when the supply curve is more elastic than the demand curve, at the equilibrium point (see Kaldor, 1934, page 135, propositions (i) and (ii).)

== Role of expectations ==
One reason to be skeptical of this model's predictions is that it assumes producers are extremely shortsighted. Assuming that farmers look back at the most recent prices in order to forecast future prices might seem very reasonable, but this backward-looking forecasting (which is called adaptive expectations) turns out to be crucial for the model's fluctuations. When farmers expect high prices to continue, they produce too much and therefore end up with low prices, and vice versa.

In the stable case, this may not be an unbelievable outcome, since the farmers' prediction errors (the difference between the price they expect and the price that actually occurs) become smaller every period. In this case, after several periods prices and quantities will come close to the point where supply and demand cross, and predicted prices will be very close to actual prices. But in the unstable case, the farmers' errors get larger every period. This seems to indicate that adaptive expectations is a misleading assumption—how could farmers fail to notice that last period's price is not a good predictor of this period's price?

The fact that agents with adaptive expectations may make ever-increasing errors over time has led many economists to conclude that it is better to assume rational expectations, that is, expectations consistent with the actual structure of the economy. However, the rational expectations assumption is controversial since it may exaggerate agents' understanding of the economy. The cobweb model serves as one of the best examples to illustrate why understanding expectation formation is so important for understanding economic dynamics, and also why expectations are so controversial in recent economic theory.

=== The "Anpassung nach Unten" and "Schraube nach Unten" argument ===
The German concepts which translate literally "adjustment to lower" and "screw to lower" are known from the works of Hans-Peter Martin and Harald Schumann, the authors of The Global Trap (1997). Martin and Schumann see the process to worsened living standards as screw-shaped. Mordecai Ezekiel's The Cobweb Theorem (1938) illustrate a screw-shaped expectations-driven process. Eino Haikala has analyzed Ezekiel's work among others, and clarified that time constitutes the axis of the screw-shape. Thus Martin and Schumann point out that the cobweb theorem works to worsen standards of living as well. The idea of expectations-variation and thus modeled and induced expectations is shown clearly in Oskar Morgenstern's Vollkommene Voraussicht und Wirtschaftliches Gleichgewicht. This article shows also that the concept of perfect foresight (vollkommene Voraussicht) is not a Robert E. Lucas or rational expectations invention but rests in game theory, Morgenstern and John von Neumann being the authors of Theory of Games and Economic Behavior (1944). This does not mean that the rational expectations hypothesis (REH) is not game theory or separate from the cobweb theorem, but vice versa. The "there must be" a random component claim by Alan A. Walters alone shows that rational (consistent) expectations is game theory, since the component is there to create an illusion of random walk.

Alan A. Walters (1971) also claims that "extrapolators" are "unsophisticated", thus differentiating between prediction and forecasting. Using induced modeled expectations is prediction, not forecasting, unless these expectations are based on extrapolation. A prediction does not have to even try to be true. To avoid a prediction to be falsified it has to be, according to Franco Modigliani and Emile Grunberg's article "The Predictability of Social Events", kept private. Thus public prediction serves private one in REH. Haikala (1956) claims that cobweb theorem is a theorem of deceiving farmers, thus seeing cobweb theorem as a kind of rational or rather, consistent, expectations model with a game-theoretic feature. This makes sense when considering the argument of Hans-Peter Martin and Harald Schumann. The truth-value of a prediction is one measure in differentiating between non-deceiving and deceiving models. In Martin and Schumann's context, a claim that anti-Keynesian policies lead to a greater welfare of the majority of mankind should be analyzed in terms of truth. One way to do this is to investigate past historical data. This is contrary to the principles of REH, where the measure of policies is an economic model, not reality, and credibility, not truth. The importance of intellectual climate emphasized in Friedmans' work means that the credibility of a prediction can be increased by manipulating public opinion, despite its lack of truth. Morgenstern (1935) states that when varying expectations, the expectation of future has always to be positive (and prediction has to be credible).

Expectation is a dynamic component in both REH and cobweb theorem, and the question of expectation formation is the key to Hans-Peter Martin's and Harald Schumann's argument, which deals with trading current welfare for expected future welfare with actually worsening policies in the middle. This 'in order to achieve that then we have to do this now' is the key in Bertrand de Jouvenel's work. Cobweb theorem and the rational (consistent) expectations hypothesis are part of welfare economics which according to Martin and Schumann's argument act now to worsen the welfare of the majority of mankind. Nicholas Kaldor's work The Scourge of Monetarism is an analysis of how the policies described by Martin and Schumann came to the United Kingdom.

== Evidence ==
=== Livestock herds ===
The cobweb model has been interpreted as an explanation of fluctuations in various livestock markets, like those documented by Arthur Hanau in German hog markets; see Pork cycle. However, Rosen et al. (1994) proposed an alternative model which showed that because of the three-year life cycle of beef cattle, cattle populations would fluctuate over time even if ranchers had perfectly rational expectations.

=== Human experimental data ===
In 1989, Wellford conducted twelve experimental sessions each conducted with five participants over thirty periods simulating the stable and unstable cases. Her results show that the unstable case did not result in the divergent behavior we see with cobweb expectations but rather the participants converged toward the rational expectations equilibrium. However, the price path variance in the unstable case was greater than that in the stable case (and the difference was shown to be statistically significant).

One way of interpreting these results is to say that in the long run, the participants behaved as if they had rational expectations, but that in the short run they made mistakes. These mistakes caused larger fluctuations in the unstable case than in the stable case.

=== Housing sector in Israel ===
The residential construction sector of Israel was, primarily as a result of waves of immigration, and still is, a principal factor in the structure of the business cycles in Israel. The increasing population, financing methods, higher income, and investment needs converged and came to be reflected through the skyrocketing demand for housing. On the other hand, technology, private and public entrepreneurship, the housing inventory and the availability of workforce have converged on the supply side. The position and direction of the housing sector in the business cycle can be identified by using a cobweb model.

== See also ==
- Adaptive expectations
- Cobweb plot
- Lotka–Volterra equation
- Pork cycle
- Tatonnement

== Sources ==
- W. Nicholson, Microeconomic Theory, 7th ed., Ch. 17, pp. 524–538. Dryden Press: ISBN 0-03-024474-9.
- Jasmina Arifovic, "Genetic Algorithm Learning and the Cobweb Model", Journal of Economic Dynamics and Control, vol. 18, Issue 1, (January 1994), 3-28.
- Arthur Hanau (1928), "Die Prognose der Schweinepreise". In: Vierteljahreshefte zur Konjunkturforschung, Verlag Reimar Hobbing, Berlin.
- Mordecai Ezekiel (February 1938). "The Cobweb Theorem" (PDF). Quarterly Journal of Economics. 52 (2): 255–280. doi:10.2307/1881734. JSTOR 1881734. Archived from the original (PDF) on 2015-06-16.
- Nicholas Kaldor, "A Classificatory Note on the Determination of Equilibrium", Review of Economic Studies, vol I (February 1934), 122–36. (See especially pages 133–135.)
- Marc Nerlove (1958). "Adaptive Expectations and Cobweb Phenomena". Quarterly Journal of Economics. 72 (2): 227–240. doi:10.2307/1880597. JSTOR 1880597.
- C.P. Wellford, 'A Laboratory Analysis of Price Dynamics and Expectations in the Cobweb Model', Discussion Paper 89-15 (University of Arizona, Tucson, AZ).
- Muth, J. F. (1961). "Rational Expectations and the Theory of Price Movements". Econometrica. 29 (3): 315–35. doi:10.2307/1909635. JSTOR 1909635.
- Pashigian, B. P. (2008). "Cobweb Theorem". The New Palgrave Dictionary of Economics (2nd ed.).
- Rosen, S.; Murphy, K.; Scheinkman, J. (1994). "Cattle Cycles". Journal of Political Economy. 102 (3): 468–92. doi:10.1086/261942. S2CID 219377989.
- Ricci, Umberto (1930). "Die 'synthetische Ökonomie' von Henry Ludwell Moore". Zeitschrift für Nationalökonomie. 1 (5): 649–668. doi:10.1007/BF01318499. S2CID 154514568.
- Schultz, H. Der Sinn der statistischen Nachfragekurven. p. 34.
- Göbels, Wolfgang (1994). "Angebot und Nachfrage – Der Marktpreis als Grenzwert einer Folge". Mathematiklehren (62): 47–49.
