= Schedule (disambiguation) =

A schedule is a time management tool consisting of a list of times at which events are to occur, or an order in which they are to occur.

Schedule may also refer to:

== Business and work ==
- Schedule (project management), including activities not related to time such as resource or risk management
- Schedule (workplace), means of planning resource schedules for work
- Scheduling (production processes), methods of planning for manufacturing purposes
- Master production schedule, a plan for individual commodities to produce
- Scheduled maintenance, list of routine maintenance activities, usually with point at which they should be performed
- Executive Schedule, pay scales within the U.S. government
- General Schedule, pay scales within the U.S. government
- Transport scheduling, calculation of public transport timetables.

== Computing ==
- Scheduling (computing), the assignment of tasks to computing resources. For example: the assignment of processes to machines.
- Database transaction schedule, a list of actions from a set of transactions in databases
- Interval scheduling
- Key schedule, cryptographic method and setup of code key

== Other uses ==
- Instrument Schedule, a listing of show equipment and information such as location and gear plan
- Drake Maye, National Football League quarterback for the New England Patriots, nicknamed "The Schedule"
- Drug schedule, listing drugs into different categories
- Schedule of reinforcement, selection of method for training
- Integrated Master Schedule, a supplement to Integrated Master Plan with durations, relationships, and links to WBS and SOW
- Schedules of concessions in international trade law
- A schedule of additional material appended to an Act of Parliament in the United Kingdom or other legislative act
  - Schedules to the Constitution of India, schedules of lists and other material appended to the Constitution of India

== See also ==
- Scheduler (disambiguation)
- Calendar (disambiguation)
