= Single-machine scheduling =

Single-machine scheduling or single-resource scheduling is an optimization problem in computer science and operations research. We are given $n$ jobs $J_{1},\dots,J_{n}$ of varying processing times, which need to be scheduled on a single machine, in a way that optimizes a certain objective, such as the throughput.

Single-machine scheduling is a special case of identical-machines scheduling, which is itself a special case of optimal job scheduling. Many problems, which are NP-hard in general, can be solved in polynomial time in the single-machine case.

In the standard three-field notation for optimal job scheduling problems, the single-machine variant is denoted by 1 in the first field. For example, " 1||$\sum C_j$" is a single-machine scheduling problem with no constraints, where the goal is to minimize the sum of completion times.

The makespan-minimization problem 1||$C_{\max}$, which is a common objective with multiple machines, is trivial with a single machine, since the makespan is always identical. Therefore, other objectives have been studied.

There are also problems where precedence constraints arise to ensure that some jobs occur before some other jobs. The precedence constraints form a partial order $(J,\prec)$, where $J$ is the set of all jobs, ordered by $\prec$. Alternatively, one can consider precedence constraints as a directed acyclic graph, $G=(J,A)$, where $A$ is the set of precedence arcs. Whenever, $J_{1} \prec J_{2}$ for two jobs $J_{1}, J_{2} \in J$ then job $J_{2}$ can only be started once job $J_{1}$ has finished processing. In the graph version, if $(J_{1},J_{2})\in A$ then job $J_{1}$must precede $J_{2}$ in any feasible schedule.

== Minimizing the sum of completion times ==
The problem 1||$\sum C_j$ aims to minimize the sum of completion times. It can be solved optimally by the Shortest Processing Time First rule (SPT): the jobs are scheduled by ascending order of their processing time $p_j$.

The problem 1||$\sum w_j C_j$ aims to minimize the weighted sum of completion times. It can be solved optimally by the Weighted Shortest Processing Time First rule (WSPT): the jobs are scheduled by ascending order of the ratio $p_j/w_j$.

The problem 1|chains|$\sum w_j C_j$ is a generalization of the above problem for jobs with dependencies in the form of chains. It can also be solved optimally by a suitable generalization of WSPT.

The problem 1|prec|$\sum w_j C_j$ is the precedence-constrained version of the original problem. This problem is strongly NP-hard. There are several approximation algorithms with an approximation factor of 2.

== Minimizing the cost of lateness ==
The problem 1||$L_{\max}$ aims to minimize the maximum lateness. For each job j, there is a due date $d_j$. If it is completed after its due date, it suffers lateness defined as $L_j := C_j - d_j$. 1||$L_{\max}$ can be solved optimally by the Earliest Due Date First rule (EDD): the jobs are scheduled by ascending order of their deadline $d_j$.

The problem 1|prec|$h_{\max}$ generalizes the 1||$L_{\max}$ in two ways: first, it allows arbitrary precedence constraints on the jobs; second, it allows each job to have an arbitrary cost function h_{j}, which is a function of its completion time (lateness is a special case of a cost function). The maximum cost can be minimized by a greedy algorithm known as Lawler's algorithm.

The problem 1|$r_j$|$L_{\max}$ generalizes 1||$L_{\max}$ by allowing each job to have a different release time by which it becomes available for processing. The presence of release times means that, in some cases, it may be optimal to leave the machine idle, in order to wait for an important job that is not released yet. Minimizing maximum lateness in this setting is NP-hard. But in practice, it can be solved using a branch-and-bound algorithm.

== Maximizing the profit of earliness ==
In settings with deadlines, it is possible that, if the job is completed by the deadline, there is a profit p_{j}. Otherwise, there is no profit. The goal is to maximize the profit. Single-machine scheduling with deadlines is NP-hard; Sahni presents both exact exponential-time algorithms and a polynomial-time approximation algorithm.

== Maximizing the throughput ==
The problem 1||$\sum U_j$ aims to minimize the number of late jobs, regardless of the amount of lateness. It can be solved optimally by the Hodgson-Moore algorithm. It can also be interpreted as maximizing the number of jobs that complete on time; this number is called the throughput.

The problem 1||$\sum w_j U_j$ aims to minimize the weight of late jobs. It is NP-hard, since the special case in which all jobs have the same deadline (denoted by 1|$d_j=d$|$\sum w_j U_j$ ) is equivalent to the Knapsack problem.

The problem 1|$r_j$|$\sum U_j$ generalizes 1||$\sum U_j$ by allowing different jobs to have different release times. The problem is NP-hard. However, when all job lengths are equal, the problem can be solved in polynomial time. It has several variants:

- The weighted optimization variant, 1|$r_j, p_j=p$|$\sum w_j U_j$, can be solved in time $O(n^7)$.
- The unweighted optimization variant, maximizing the number of jobs that finish on time, denoted 1|$r_j, p_j=p$|$\sum U_j$, can be solved in time $O(n^5)$ using dynamic programming, when all release times and deadlines are integers.
- The decision variant - deciding whether it is possible that all given jobs complete on time - can be solved by several algorithms, the fastest of them runs in time $O(n \log n)$.

Jobs can have execution intervals. For each job j, there is a processing time t_{j} and a start-time s_{j}, so it must be executed in the interval [s_{j}, s_{j}+t_{j}]. Since some of the intervals overlap, not all jobs can be completed. The goal is to maximize the number of completed jobs, that is, the throughput. More generally, each job may have several possible intervals, and each interval may be associated with a different profit. The goal is to choose at most one interval for each job, such that the total profit is maximized. For more details, see the page on interval scheduling.

More generally, jobs can have time-windows, with both start-times and deadlines, which may be larger than the job length. Each job can be scheduled anywhere within its time-window. Bar-Noy, Bar-Yehuda, Freund, Naor and Schieber present a (1-ε)/2 approximation.

== Jobs with non-constant length ==
Workers and machines often become tired after working for a certain amount of time, and this makes them slower when processing future jobs. On the other hand, workers and machines may learn how to work better, and this makes them faster when processing future jobs. In both cases, the length (processing-time) of a job is not constant, but depends on the jobs processed before it. In this setting, even minimizing the maximum completion time becomes non-trivial. There are two common ways to model the change in job length.

1. The job length may depend on the start time of the job. When the length is a weakly-increasing function of the start-time, it is deterioration effect; when it is weakly-decreasing, it is called learning effect.
2. The job length may depend on the sum of normal processing times of previously-processed jobs. When the length is a weakly-increasing function of this sum, it is often called aging effect.

=== Start-time-based length ===
Cheng and Ding studied makespan minimization and maximum-lateness minimization when the actual length of job j scheduled at time s_{j} is given by

$\widehat{p_j}(s_j) = p_j - b\cdot s_j$, where p_{j} is the normal length of j.

They proved the following results:

- When jobs can have arbitrary deadlines, the problems are strongly NP-hard by reduction from 3-partition;
- When jobs can have one of two deadlines, the problems are NP-complete, by reduction from partition.
- When jobs can have arbitrary release times, the problems are strongly NP-hard, by reduction from the problem with arbitrary deadlines.
- When jobs can have one of two release times, either 0 or R, the problems are NP-complete.

Kubiak and van-de-Velde studied makespan minimization when the fatigue starts only after a common due-date d. That is, the actual length of job j scheduled at time s_{j} is given by

$\widehat{p_j}(s_j) = \max(p_j, p_j + b_j\cdot (s_j-d))$.

So, if the job starts before d, its length does not change; if it starts after d, its length grows by a job-dependent rate. They show that the problem is NP-hard, give a pseudopolynomial algorithm that runs in time $O(n d \sum_j p_j)$, and give a branch-and-bound algorithm that solves instances with up to 100 jobs in reasonable time. They also study bounded deterioration, where p_{j} stops growing if the job starts after a common maximum deterioration date D > d. For this case, they give two pseudopolynomial time algorithms.

Cheng, Ding and Lin surveyed several studies of a deterioration effect, where the length of job j scheduled at time s_{j} is either linear or piecewise linear, and the change rate can be positive or negative.

=== Sum-of-processing-times-based length ===
The aging effect has two types:

- In the position-based aging model, the processing time of a job depends on the number of jobs processed before it, that is, on its position in the sequence.
- In sum-of-processing-time-based aging model, the processing time of a job is a weakly-increasing function of the sum of normal (=unaffected by aging) processing times of the jobs processed before it.

Wang, Wang, Wang and Wang studied sum-of-processing-time-based aging model, where the processing-time of job j scheduled at position v is given by

$\widehat{p_j}(\pi,v) = p_j\cdot \left(1 + \sum_{l=1}^{v-1} p_{\pi(l)}\right)^\alpha$

where $\pi(l)$ is the job scheduled at position $l$, and α is the "aging characteristic" of the machine. In this model, the maximum processing time of the permutation $\pi$ is:

$\sum_{l=1}^n \widehat{p_{\pi(l)}}(\pi,l)$

Rudek generalized the model in two ways: allowing the fatigue to be different than the processing time, and allowing a job-dependent aging characteristic:

$\widehat{p_j}(\pi,v) = p_j\cdot \left(1 + \sum_{l=1}^{v-1} f(p_{\pi(l)})\right)^{\alpha_j}$

Here, f is an increasing function that describes the dependence of the fatigue on the processing time; and α_{j} is the aging characteristic of job j. For this model, he proved the following results:

- Minimizing the maximum completion time and minimizing the maximum lateness are polynomial-time solvable.
- Minimizing the maximum completion time and minimizing the maximum lateness are strongly NP-hard if some jobs have deadlines.

== See also ==
- Interval scheduling

Many solution techniques have been applied to solving single machine scheduling problems. Some of them are listed below.

- Genetic algorithms
- Neural networks
- Simulated annealing
- Ant colony optimization
- Tabu search
