= Quality control and genetic algorithms =

The combination of quality control and genetic algorithms led to novel solutions of complex quality control design and optimization problems. Quality is the degree to which a set of inherent characteristics of an entity fulfils a need or expectation that is stated, general implied or obligatory. ISO 9000 defines quality control as "A part of quality management focused on fulfilling quality requirements". Genetic algorithms are search algorithms, based on the mechanics of natural selection and natural genetics.

== Quality control ==
Alternative quality control (QC) procedures can be applied to a process to test statistically the null hypothesis, that the process conforms to the quality specifications and consequently is in control, against the alternative, that the process is out of control. When a true null hypothesis is rejected, a statistical type I error is committed. We have then a false rejection of a run of the process. The probability of a type I error is called probability of false rejection. When a false null hypothesis is accepted, a statistical type II error is committed. We fail then to detect a significant change in the probability density function of a quality characteristic of the process. The probability of rejection of a false null hypothesis equals the probability of detection of the nonconformity of the process to the quality specifications.

The QC procedure to be designed or optimized can be formulated as:

$Q_1 ( n_1,\mathbf{ X_1} ) \# Q_2 ( n_2,\mathbf{ X_2} ) \# ... \# Q_q (n_q,\mathbf{ X_q} )\;$ (1)

where $Q_i ( n_i,\mathbf{ X_i} )\;$denotes a statistical decision rule, n_{i} denotes the size of the sample S_{i}, that is the number of the samples the rule is applied upon, and $\mathbf{ X_i}\;$denotes the vector of the rule specific parameters, including the decision limits. Each symbol # denotes either the Boolean operator AND or the operator OR. Obviously, for # denoting AND, and for n_{1} < n_{2} <...< n_{q}, that is for S_{1} ⊂ S_{2} ⊂ .... ⊂ S_{q}, the (1) denotes a q-sampling QC procedure.

Each statistical decision rule is evaluated by calculating the respective statistic of the measured quality characteristic of the sample. Then, if the statistic is out of the interval between the decision limits, the decision rule is considered to be true. Many statistics can be used, including the following: a single value of the variable of a sample, the range, the mean, and the standard deviation of the values of the variable of the samples, the cumulative sum, the smoothed mean, and the smoothed standard deviation. Finally, the QC procedure is evaluated as a Boolean proposition. If it is true, then the null hypothesis is considered to be false, the process is considered to be out of control, and the run is rejected.

A quality control procedure is considered to be optimum when it minimizes (or maximizes) a context specific objective function. The objective function depends on the probabilities of detection of the nonconformity of the process and of false rejection. These probabilities depend on the parameters of the quality control procedure (1) and on the probability density functions (see probability density function) of the monitored variables of the process.

== Genetic algorithms ==
Genetic algorithms are robust search algorithms, that do not require knowledge of the objective function to be optimized and search through large spaces quickly. Genetic algorithms have been derived from the processes of the molecular biology of the gene and the evolution of life. Their operators, cross-over, mutation, and reproduction, are isomorphic with the synonymous biological processes. Genetic algorithms have been used to solve a variety of complex optimization problems. Additionally the classifier systems and the genetic programming paradigm have shown us that genetic algorithms can be used for tasks as complex as the program induction.

== Quality control and genetic algorithms ==
In general, we can not use algebraic methods to optimize the quality control procedures. Usage of enumerative methods would be very tedious, especially with multi-rule procedures, as the number of the points of the parameter space to be searched grows exponentially with the number of the parameters to be optimized. Optimization methods based on genetic algorithms offer an appealing alternative.

Furthermore, the complexity of the design process of novel quality control procedures is obviously greater than the complexity of the optimization of predefined ones.

In fact, since 1993, genetic algorithms have been used successfully to optimize and to design novel quality control procedures.

== See also ==
- Quality control
- Genetic algorithm
- Optimization (mathematics)
