= Journal of Economics =

Academic journal of economics

Journal of Economics, founded as Zeitschrift für Nationalökonomie, is an academic journal of economics with an emphasis on mathematical microeconomic theory, although it publishes occasional articles on macroeconomics.

Zeitschrift für Nationalökonomie was first published in 1930, as a revival of an earlier Zeitschrift für Volkswirtschaft, Sozialpolitik und Verwaltung which was published from 1892 into 1927 (from 1921 under the name Zeitschrift für Volkswirtschaft und Socialpolitik). The initial editor of Zeitschrift für Nationalökonomie was Hans Mayer, a third-generation member of the Austrian School. Mayer avowedly welcomed contributions from all schools of thought, so long as the work were scientifically rigorous and not politically ideological in nature.

It is published by Springer Vienna, a division of Springer Science+Business Media.
