= Job-shop scheduling =

Optimization problem

Job-shop scheduling, the job-shop problem (JSP) or job-shop scheduling problem (JSSP) is an optimization problem in computer science and operations research. It is a variant of optimal job scheduling. In a general job scheduling problem, we are given n jobs J_{1}, J_{2}, ..., J_{n} of varying processing times, which need to be scheduled on m machines with varying processing power, while trying to minimize the makespan – the total length of the schedule (that is, when all the jobs have finished processing). In the specific variant known as job-shop scheduling, each job consists of a set of operations O_{1}, O_{2}, ..., O_{n} which need to be processed in a specific order (known as precedence constraints). Each operation has a specific machine that it needs to be processed on and only one operation in a job can be processed at a given time. A common relaxation is the flexible job shop, where each operation can be processed on any machine of a given set (the machines in each set are identical).

The name originally came from the scheduling of jobs in a job shop, but the theme has wide applications beyond that type of instance. It is a well-known combinatorial optimization problem and was the first to undergo competitive analysis, introduced by Graham in 1966. The best problem instances for a basic model with a makespan objective are due to Taillard.

In the standard three-field notation for optimal job scheduling problems, the job-shop variant is denoted by J in the first field. For example, the problem denoted by "$J_3 | p_{ij} | C_\max$" is a 3-machines job-shop problem with unit processing times, where the goal is to minimize the maximum completion time.

== Problem variations ==
Many variations of the problem exist, including the following:

- Machines can have duplicates (flexible job shop with duplicate machines) or belong to groups of identical machines (flexible job shop).
- Machines can require a certain gap between jobs or no idle-time.
- Machines can have sequence-dependent setups.
- Objective function can be to minimize the makespan, the L_{p} norm, tardiness, maximum lateness etc. It can also be multi-objective optimization problem.
- Certain jobs must be completed before others can start (see workflow), and objectives may involve multiple-criteria.
- Set of jobs can relate to different set of machines.
- Deterministic (fixed) processing times or probabilistic processing times.

== NP-hardness ==
Since the traveling salesman problem is NP-hard, the job-shop problem with sequence-dependent setup is also NP-hard since the TSP is a special case of the JSP with a single job (the salesman in TSP) and the machines (the cities in TSP).

== Problem representation ==
The disjunctive graph is one of the popular models used for describing the job-shop scheduling problem instances.

A mathematical statement of the problem can be made as follows:

Let $M = \{ M_{1}, M_{2}, \dots, M_{m} \}$ and $J = \{ J_{1}, J_{2}, \dots, J_{n} \}$ be two finite sets. On account of the industrial origins of the problem, the $\displaystyle M_{i}$ are called machines and the $\displaystyle J_{j}$ are called jobs.

Let $\displaystyle \ \mathcal{X}$ denote the set of all sequential assignments of jobs to machines, such that every job is done by every machine exactly once; elements $x \in \mathcal{X}$ may be written as $n \times m$ matrices, in which column $\displaystyle i$ lists the jobs that machine $\displaystyle M_{i}$ will do, in order. For example, the matrix

$$x = \begin{pmatrix} 1 & 2 \\ 2 & 3 \\ 3 & 1 \end{pmatrix}$$

means that machine $\displaystyle M_{1}$ will do the three jobs $\displaystyle J_{1}, J_{2}, J_{3}$ in the order $\displaystyle J_{1}, J_{2}, J_{3}$, while machine $\displaystyle M_{2}$ will do the jobs in the order $\displaystyle J_{2}, J_{3}, J_{1}$.

Suppose also that there is some cost function $C : \mathcal{X} \to [0, + \infty]$. The cost function may be interpreted as a "total processing time", and may have some expression in terms of times $C_{ij} : M \times J \to [0, + \infty]$, the cost/time for machine $\displaystyle M_{i}$ to do job $\displaystyle J_{j}$.

The job-shop problem is to find an assignment of jobs $x \in \mathcal{X}$ such that $\displaystyle C(x)$ is a minimum, that is, there is no $y \in \mathcal{X}$ such that $\displaystyle C(x) > C(y)$.

== Scheduling efficiency ==
Scheduling efficiency can be defined for a schedule through the ratio of total machine idle time to the total processing time as below:

$C'=1+{\sum_{i}l_i \over \sum_{j,k}p_{jk}}={C.m \over \sum_{j,k}p_{jk}}$

Where $l_i$ represents the idle time of machine i, C is the makespan, and m is the number of machines. This formulation normalizes the makespan by the number of machines and total processing time, allowing for the comparison of resource utilization across job-shop scheduling (JSP) instances of varying sizes.

== The problem of infinite cost ==
One of the first problems that must be dealt with in the JSP is that many proposed solutions have infinite cost: i.e., there exists $x_{\infty} \in \mathcal{X}$ such that $C(x_{\infty}) = + \infty$. In fact, it is quite simple to concoct examples of such $x_{\infty}$ by ensuring that two machines will deadlock, so that each waits for the output of the other's next step.

== Major results ==
Graham introduced the List scheduling algorithm in 1966, which is (2 − 1/m)-competitive, where m is the number of machines. It was later proven to be the optimal online algorithm for two and three machines. The Coffman–Graham algorithm (1972) for uniform-length jobs is also optimal for two machines and (2 − 2/m)-competitive.

In 1992, Bartal, Fiat, Karloff, and Vohra presented a 1.986-competitive algorithm, followed by a 1.945-competitive algorithm by Karger, Philips, and Torng in 1994. That same year, Albers introduced a different 1.923-competitive algorithm. The best known result is by Fleischer and Wahl, achieving a 1.9201 competitive ratio.

Albers also established a lower bound of 1.852. Taillard instances play a key role in developing job-shop scheduling with a makespan objective.

In 1976, Garey proved that this problem is NP-complete for m > 2, meaning no optimal solution can be computed in polynomial time unless P=NP.

In 2011, Xin Chen et al. provided optimal algorithms for online scheduling on two related machines, improving previous results.

== Offline makespan minimization ==
=== Atomic jobs ===
The simplest form of the offline makespan minimisation problem deals with atomic jobs, that is, jobs that are not subdivided into multiple operations. It is equivalent to packing a number of items of various different sizes into a fixed number of bins, such that the maximum bin size needed is as small as possible. (If instead the number of bins is to be minimised, and the bin size is fixed, the problem becomes a different problem, known as the bin packing problem.)

Dorit S. Hochbaum and David Shmoys presented a polynomial-time approximation scheme in 1987 that finds an approximate solution to the offline makespan minimisation problem with atomic jobs to any desired degree of accuracy.

=== Jobs consisting of multiple operations ===
The basic form of the problem of scheduling jobs with multiple (M) operations, over M machines, such that all of the first operations must be done on the first machine, all of the second operations on the second, etc., and a single job cannot be performed in parallel, is known as the flow-shop scheduling problem. Various algorithms exist, including genetic algorithms.

==== Johnson's algorithm ====
A heuristic algorithm by S. M. Johnson can be used to solve the case of a 2 machine N job problem when all jobs are to be processed in the same order. The steps of algorithm are as follows:

Job P_{i} has two operations, of duration P_{i1}, P_{i2}, to be done on Machine M1, M2 in that sequence.

- Step 1. List A = { 1, 2, …, N }, List L1 = {}, List L2 = {}.
- Step 2. From all available operation durations, pick the minimum.

If the minimum belongs to P_{k1},

Remove K from list A; Add K to end of List L1.

If minimum belongs to P_{k2},

Remove K from list A; Add K to beginning of List L2.

- Step 3. Repeat Step 2 until List A is empty.
- Step 4. Join List L1, List L2. This is the optimum sequence.

Johnson's method only works optimally for two machines. However, since it is optimal, and easy to compute, some researchers have tried to adopt it for M machines, (M > 2.)

The idea is as follows: Imagine that each job requires m operations in sequence, on M1, M2 … Mm. We combine the first m/2 machines into an (imaginary) Machining center, MC1, and the remaining Machines into a Machining Center MC2. Then the total processing time for a Job P on MC1 = sum (operation times on first m/2 machines), and processing time for Job P on MC2 = sum(operation times on last m/2 machines).

By doing so, we have reduced the m-Machine problem into a Two Machining center scheduling problem. We can solve this using Johnson's method.

== Makespan prediction ==
Machine learning has been recently used to predict the optimal makespan of a JSP instance without actually producing the optimal schedule. Preliminary results show around 80% accuracy in classifying small randomly generated JSP instances by optimal scheduling efficiency using supervised learning.

== Example ==
Here is an example of a job-shop scheduling problem formulated in AMPL as a mixed-integer programming problem with indicator constraints:

param N_JOBS;
param N_MACHINES;

set JOBS ordered = 1..N_JOBS;
set MACHINES ordered = 1..N_MACHINES;

param ProcessingTime{JOBS, MACHINES} > 0;

param CumulativeTime{i in JOBS, j in MACHINES} =
   sum {jj in MACHINES: ord(jj) <= ord(j)} ProcessingTime[i,jj];

param TimeOffset{i1 in JOBS, i2 in JOBS: i1 <> i2} =
   max {j in MACHINES}
     (CumulativeTime[i1,j] - CumulativeTime[i2,j] + ProcessingTime[i2,j]);

var end >= 0;
var start{JOBS} >= 0;
var precedes{i1 in JOBS, i2 in JOBS: ord(i1) < ord(i2)} binary;

minimize makespan: end;

subj to makespan_def{i in JOBS}:
   end >= start[i] + sum{j in MACHINES} ProcessingTime[i,j];

subj to no12_conflict{i1 in JOBS, i2 in JOBS: ord(i1) < ord(i2)}:
   precedes[i1,i2] ==> start[i2] >= start[i1] + TimeOffset[i1,i2];

subj to no21_conflict{i1 in JOBS, i2 in JOBS: ord(i1) < ord(i2)}:
   !precedes[i1,i2] ==> start[i1] >= start[i2] + TimeOffset[i2,i1];

data;

param N_JOBS := 4;
param N_MACHINES := 4;

param ProcessingTime:
   1 2 3 4 :=
1  5 4 2 1
2  8 3 6 2
3  9 7 2 3
4  3 1 5 8;

== Related problems ==
- Flow-shop scheduling is a similar problem but without the constraint that each operation must be done on a specific machine (only the order constraint is kept).
- Open-shop scheduling is a similar problem but also without the order constraint.

== See also ==
- Disjunctive graph
- Dynamic programming
- Genetic algorithm scheduling
- List of NP-complete problems
- Optimal control
- Scheduling (production processes)
