= Method of equal shares =

Method of counting ballots following elections

The method of equal shares (MES) is a participatory budgeting algorithm specifically designed to guarantee extended justified representation (a form of proportional representation). It was originally developed for committee elections (under the name Rule X). It was later adapted to participatory budgeting (PB) and to simultaneous public decisions. It can be used with any available ballot format, including approval ballots, ranked ballots or cardinal ballots. MES has been used for participatory budgeting in various European cities.

MES can be described as a member of a class of voting methods called expanding approvals rules introduced earlier in 2019 by Aziz and Lee for ordinal preferences (that include approval ballots).

== Motivation ==
Most cities running participatory budgeting use the knapsack algorithm, even though it is a disproportional method. For example, if 51% of the population support 10 red projects and 49% support 10 blue projects, and there is only funding for 10 projects, knapsack budgeting will choose the 10 red supported by the 51%, and the 49% will go unfunded.

In contrast, MES guarantees proportional representation. Specifically, it satisfies an extended variant of the justified representation axiom, adapted to participatory budgeting. This says that a group of X percent of the population will have X percent of the budget spent on projects supported by the group (assuming that all members of the group have voted the same or at least similarly). In particular, in the above example, MES would pick at least 5 blue and at least 4 red projects (the 10th project could be either red or blue, depending on the completion method used).

In the context of committee elections, there are other rules with similar justified representation guarantees, such as proportional approval voting. However, MES runs in polynomial time, and thus can be applied easily even to realistic elections, with a large number of voters.

== Procedure ==
MES has several variants, all of which have the following structure for participatory budgeting:

1. Initialization – The set of "winners" (chosen candidates) is initialized to an empty set. Each voter i is allocated b_{i} units of virtual money; usually, b_{i} equals the total available budget divided by n (the number of voters).

2. Main loop – Each round consists of two steps:

- (a) One of the remaining candidates is chosen and added to the set of winners.
- (b) The chosen candidate is funded by its supporters; that is, each voter who supports it "pays" a certain amount from their virtual money, such that the sum of all payments equals the candidate cost.

As the total virtual money decreases at each round, eventually no more projects can be funded; at that point, the main loop ends.

3. Completion – If the available budget is not exhausted (i.e., some voters still have virtual money, but it is not sufficient to fund any remaining candidate), then some completion method can be used to add some candidates, until no more candidates can be added subject to the budget constraints.

For committee elections the same structure is used, except that the "cost" of each candidate is assumed to be 1, and the total available "budget" is the desired committee size (usually denoted k). So each voter initially receives k/n virtual money units.

MES variants differ in how they choose a candidate in each round, and how they distribute its cost among the agents.

== Main loop: approval ballots and binary utilities ==
If the voters vote via approval ballots, then MES aims to distribute the cost of a chosen project p as equally as possible among its supporters. Specifically:

- If some s voters approve p, and each of them has at least cost(p)/s virtual money, then each of them pays exactly cost(p)/s.
- Otherwise, supporters with too little remaining money pay all their remaining money, and the remaining cost is divided equally among the remaining supporters. This means that each of the remaining supporters pays more than cost(p)/s.

Formally, for $\rho \ge 0$, we say that project $p$ is $\rho$-affordable if

$$\begin{align}
\sum_{i \in N, i \text{ approves } p} \min\left( b_i, \rho \right) = \mathrm{cost}(p) \text{.}
\end{align}$$

Here, each supporter i with too little virtual money pays b_{i}, whereas all other supporters pay $\rho$. Here are some examples.

- A project with cost 100 is supported by 4 voters, with virtual money 25, 50, 75 and 100 respectively. As 100/4=25 and all supporters have at least 25 virtual money, all of them will pay 25—the project is 25-affordable. The agents will remain with 0, 25, 50 and 75 virtual money respectively.
- A project with cost 105 is supported by the same 4 voters, with virtual money 0, 25, 50 and 75. The first cannot contribute at all. The second cannot contribute 100/3, so they contributes their entire remaining 25. The remaining cost is 80. It can be divided equally among the third and fourth supporters, each of whom would pay 40. So the project is 40-affordable. The agents will remain with 0, 0, 10 and 35 virtual money respectively.

At each round, the chosen project is a project that is $\rho$-affordable for the smallest $\rho$. That is, we chose a project that minimizes the maximum amount paid by a single supporter.

=== Example 1 ===
In the following example, there are 9 projects, each of which costs $200. There are 100 voters with approval ballots. The total budget equals $1000, which allows five projects to be selected from the available nine. See the animated diagram below, which illustrates the behaviour of the rule.

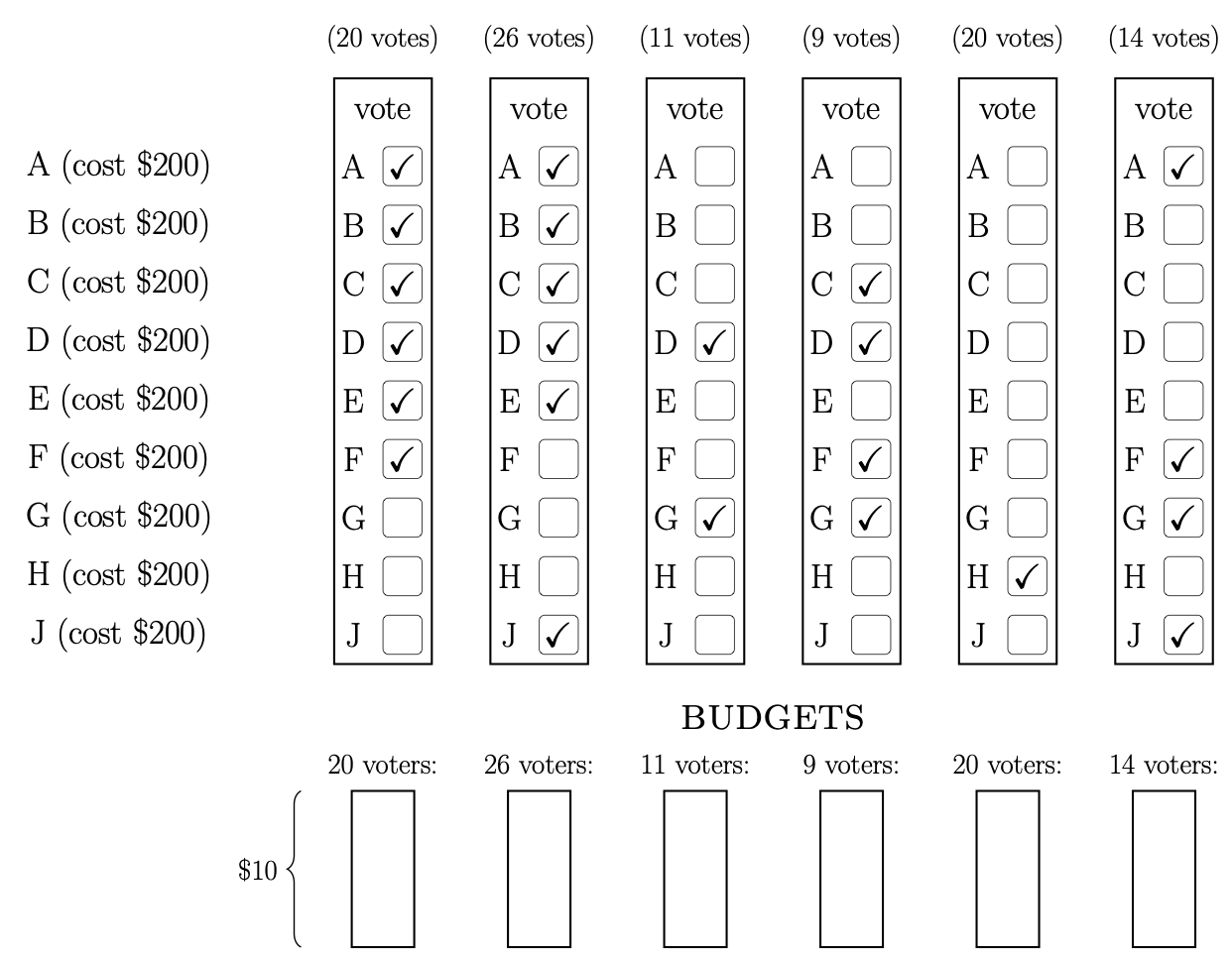
There are 9 projects. For example, the third group of 11 voters voted for D and G. The total budget of $1000 is divided equally among 100 voters. Each voter is given 10. Click on the arrow above the image in order to see the next steps of the method.

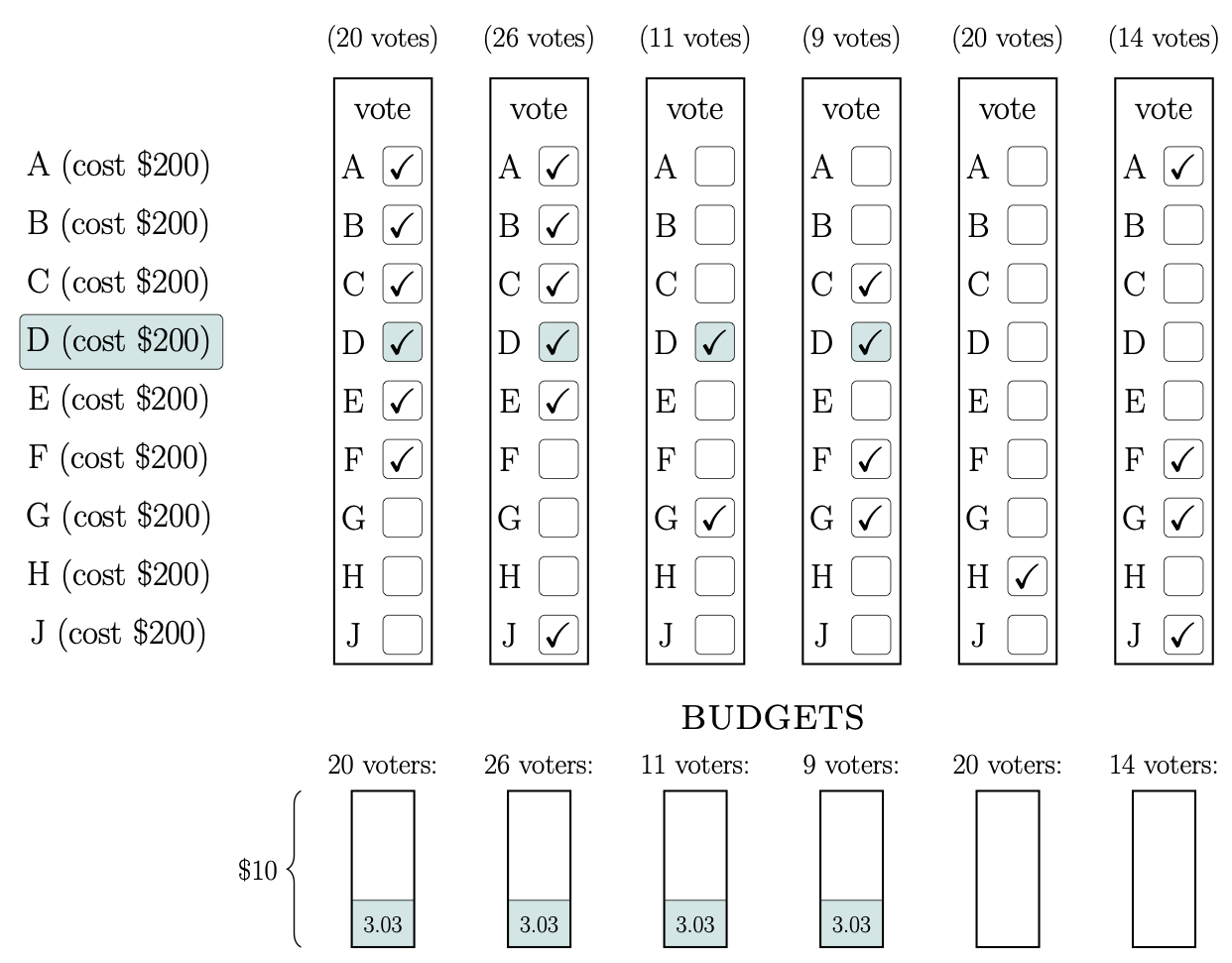
Project D obtained most votes. If we divided the cost of D equally among its supporters, each voter would pay $3.03. D is the project that minimises the maximal voter payment and so it is selected.

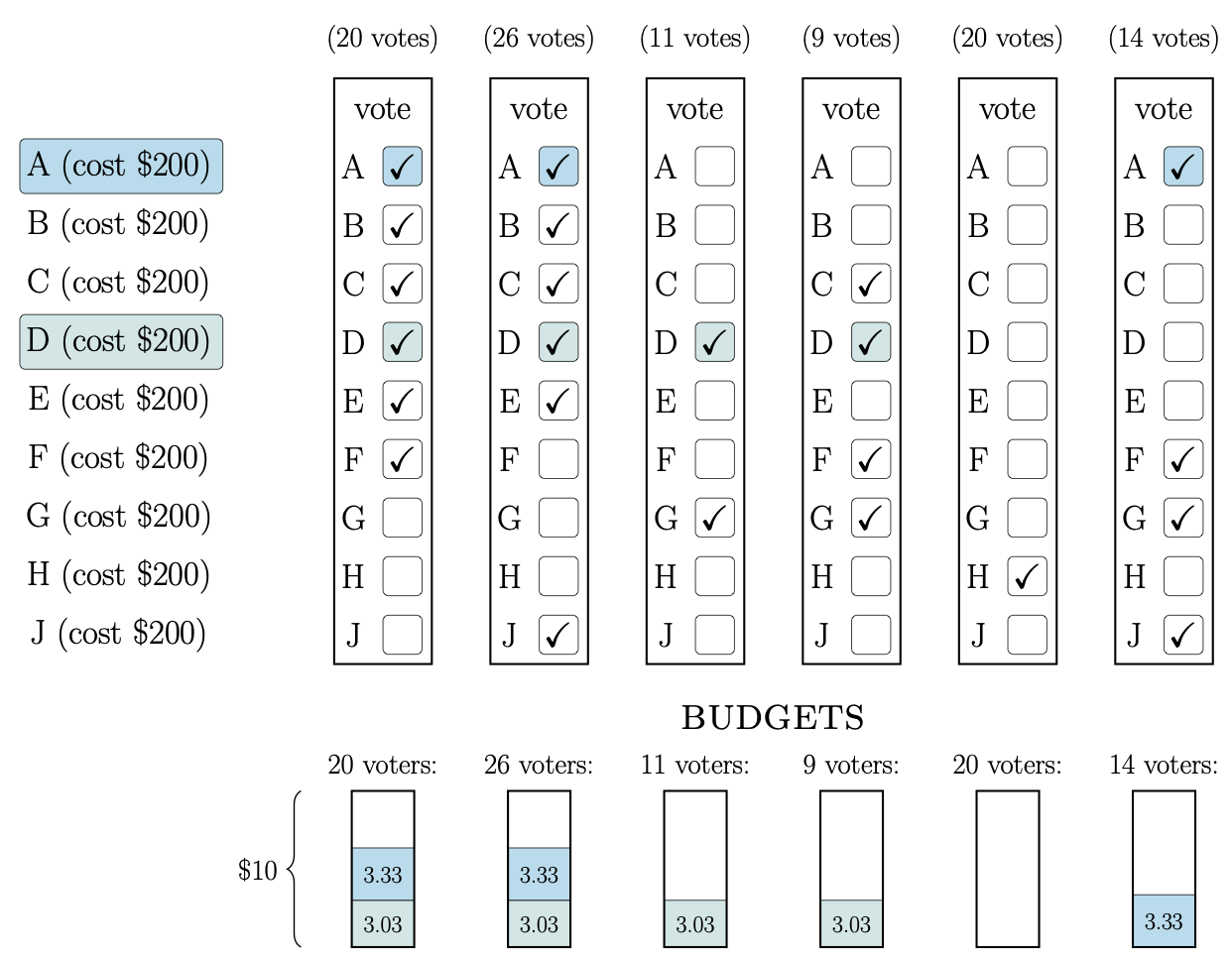
Project A obtained 60 votes. Analogously to the previous step: if we divided the cost of A equally among its supporters, each voter would pay at most $3.33. Project A minimises the maximal voter payment and so is selected.

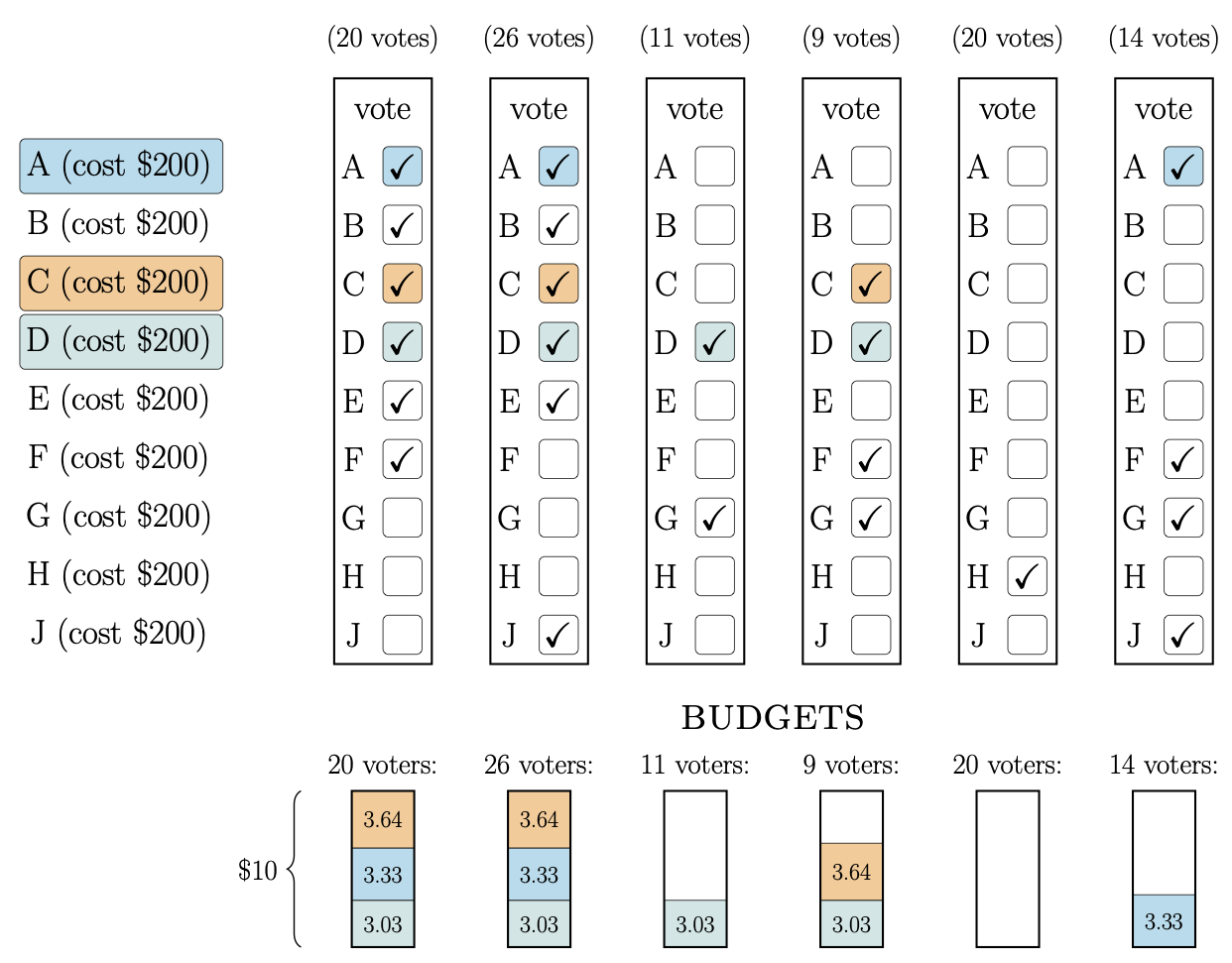
Project C obtained 56 votes and is selected in the third round. Each supporter of C needs to pay $3.64, and this is the minimal possible payment. At this point the first 46 voters run out of their money.

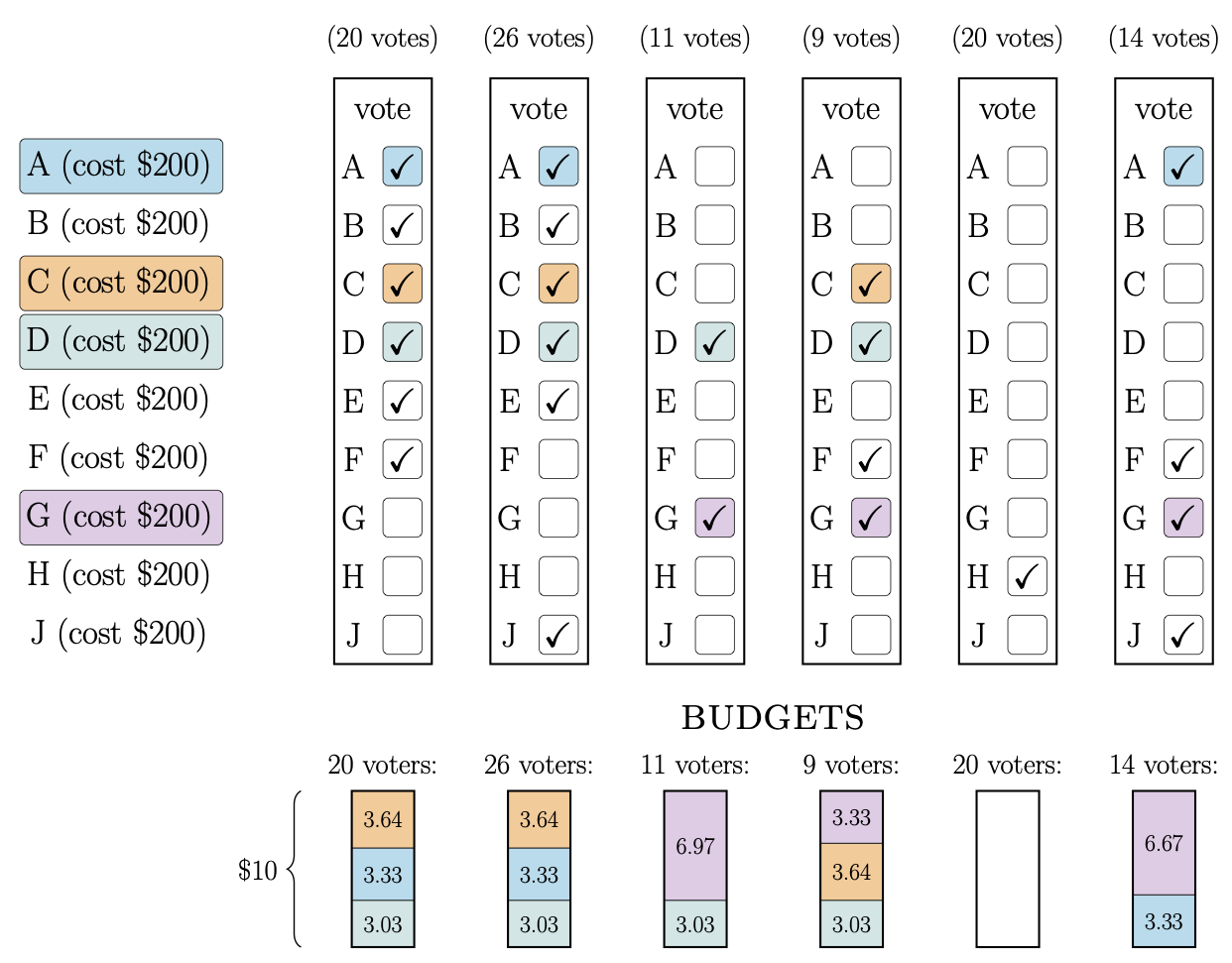
In the fourth step project G is selected. Some voters do not have enough money to participate equally in the purchase, so they pay all money left. The maximal payment for this candidate equals $6.97.

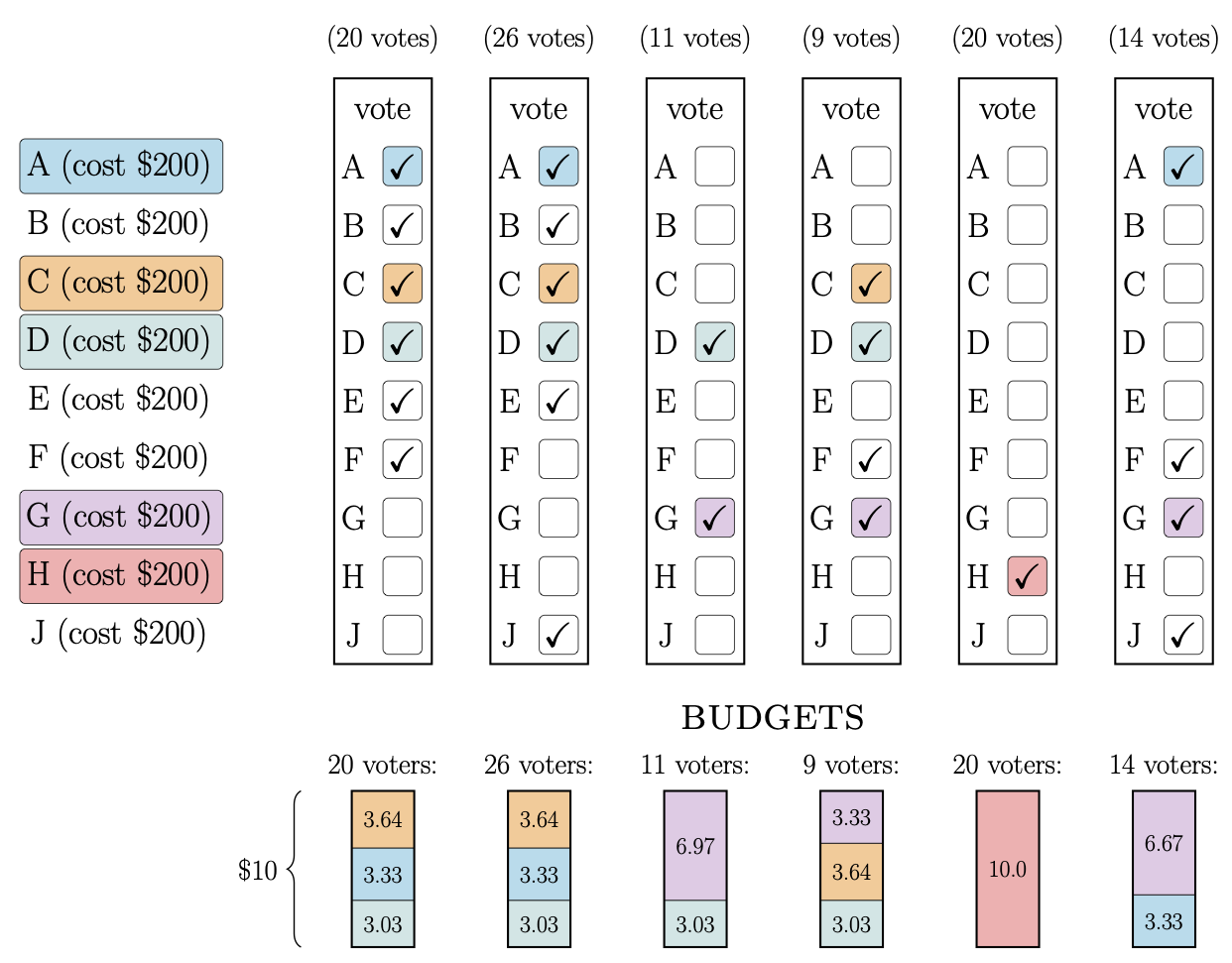
In the last step, project H is selected. Now, only the fourth group of voters has money. They have enough money to afford the project they voted for. The maximal payment for the selected project is now $10.

The budget is first divided equally among the voters; thus, each voter gets $10. Project $\mathrm{D}$ received the most votes, and it is selected in the first round. If we divided the cost of $\mathrm{D}$ equally among the voters who supported $\mathrm{D}$, each of them would pay $\$200/66 \approx \$3.03$. In contrast, if we selected $\mathrm{E}$, then the cost per voter would be $\$200/46 \approx \$4.34$. The method selects first the project that minimises the price per voter.

Note that in the last step, project $\mathrm{H}$ was selected even though there were projects which were supported by more voters, say $\mathrm{E}$. This is because, the money that the supporters of $\mathrm{E}$ had the right to control was used previously to justify the selection of $\mathrm{D}$, $\mathrm{A}$, and $\mathrm{C}$. On the other hand, the voters who voted for $\mathrm{H}$ form 20 percent of the population and so shall have right to decide about 20 percent of the budget. Those voters supported only $\mathrm{H}$, and this is why this project was selected.

For a more detailed example including cardinal ballots, see Example 2.

== Main loop: cardinal ballots ==
If the voters vote via cardinal ballots, then MES aims to distribute the cost of a chosen project p proportionally to the utilities the voters enjoy from the project. Formally, we have a set of projects $P = \{p_1, p_2, \ldots, p_m\}$, and a set of voters $N = \{1, 2, \ldots, n\}$. For each project $p \in P$ let $\mathrm{cost}(p)$ denote its cost and let $b$ denote the size of the available municipal budget.

For each voter $i \in N$ and each project $p \in P$ let $u_i(p)$ denote the $i$'s cardinal ballot on $p$, that is the number that quantifies the level of appreciation of voter $i$ towards project $p$. For any $\rho \ge 0$, we say that project $p$ is $\rho$-affordable if

$$\begin{align}
\sum_{i \in N} \min\left( b_i, \rho \cdot u_i(p) \right) = \mathrm{cost}(p) \text{.}
\end{align}$$

Intuitively, if a project p is $\rho$-affordable, then its cost can be spread among the voters in a way that each voter pays the price-per-utility of at most $\rho$ (voters with enough money will pay $\rho \cdot u_i(p)$, and the other voters will pay their entire remaining money b_{i}).

If there is at least one not-yet-selected $\rho$-affordable project, MES selects the project p that is $\rho$-affordable for the lowest value of $\rho$ (the project that minimises the price-per-utility that the voters need to pay).

=== Example 2 ===
The following diagram illustrates the behaviour of MES with cardinal ballots.

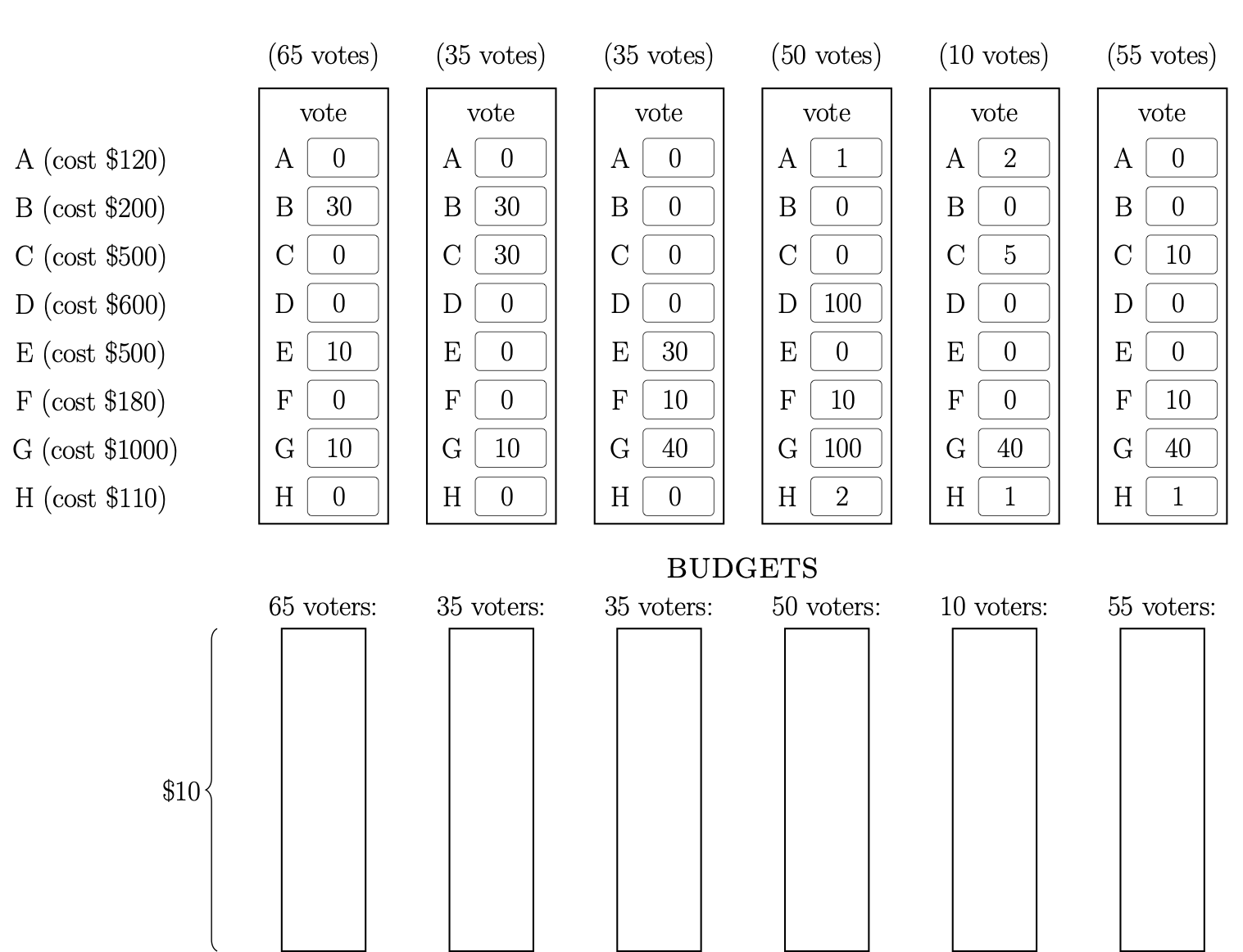
There are 8 available projects and 250 voters. For example, the first 65 voters assign value 30 to project B and value 10 to projects E and G. The total budget of $2500 is divided equally among 250 voters. Each voter is given $10. Click on the arrow above the image in order to see the next steps of the method.

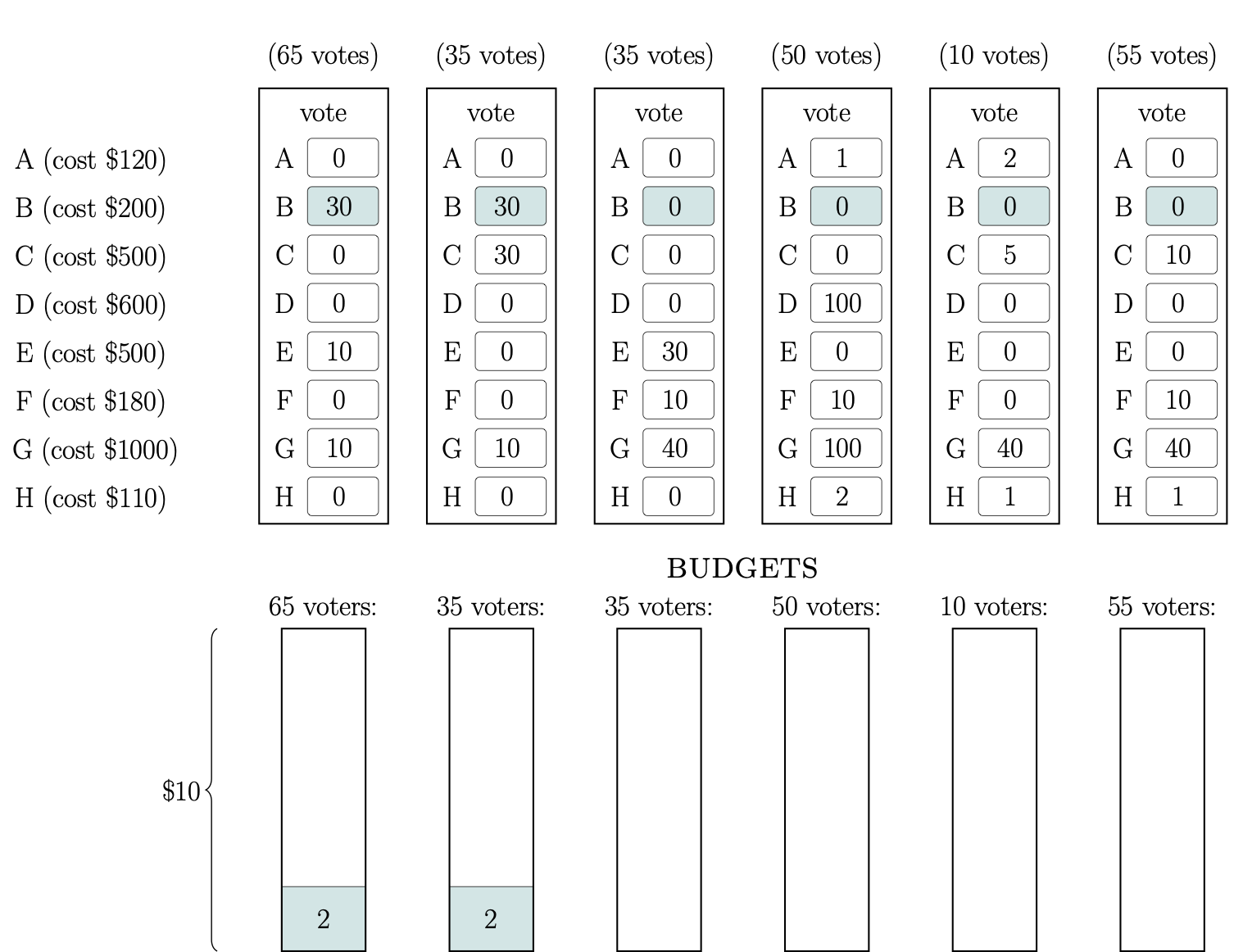
Project B is selected first, and its cost is divided proportionally to the values that the voters assigned to the project. In this case, this means it is divided equally among the voters from the first and the second group. Each such voter pays $2, and for those $2 they get the utility of 30. Thus, the maximal payment-per-utility equals $2/30 \approx 0.066$. If a different project was selected, the maximal payment-per-utility would be higher.

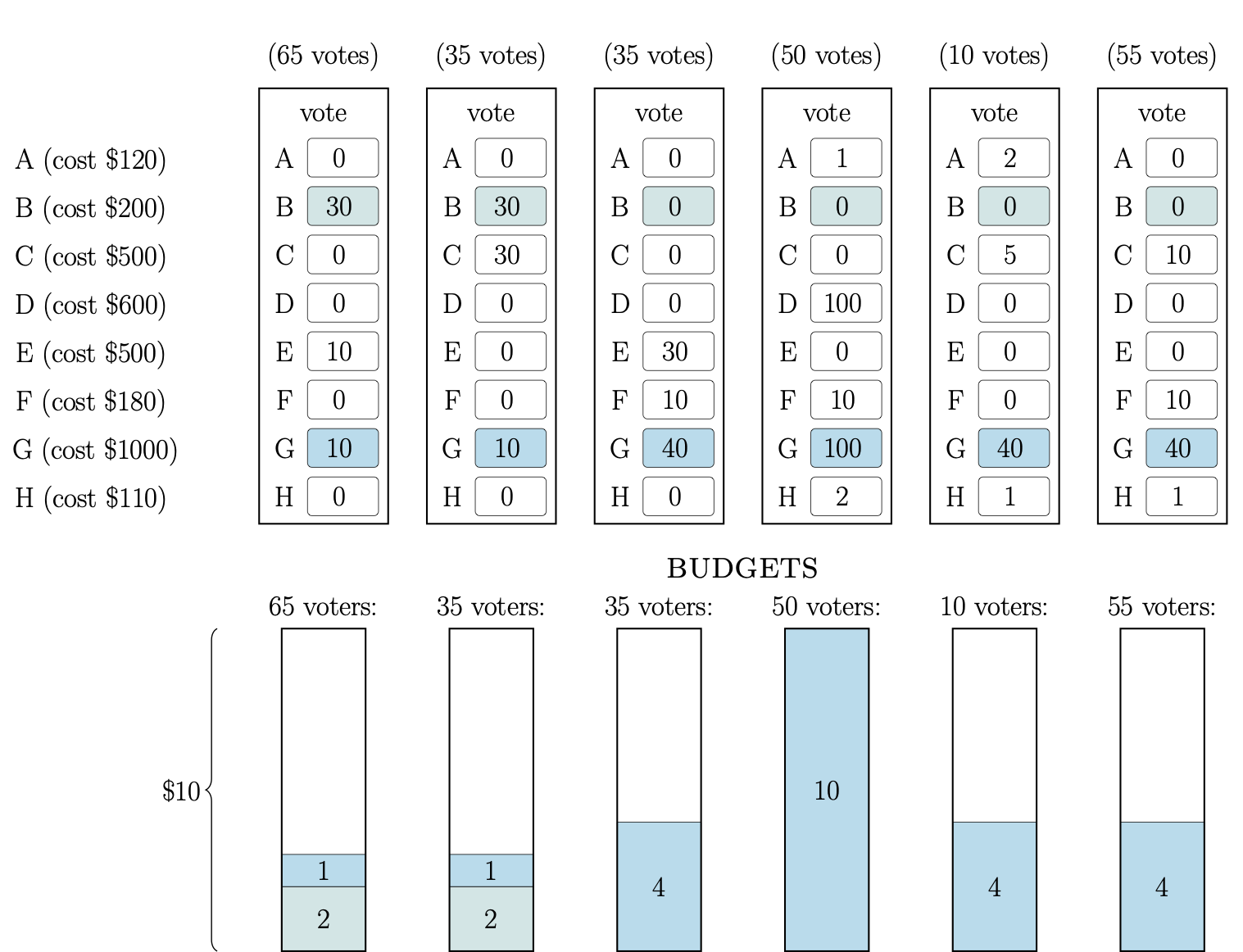
Consider project G and the payments presented in the picture. The payments are not equal, but they are still proportional to the values that the voters' assigned to G. The maximal voter's payment-per-utility for project G equals $1/10 = 4/40 = 10/100 = 0.1$ and this value is minimal across all projects. Consequently, G is selected. After this round the voters from the fourth group have run out of money.

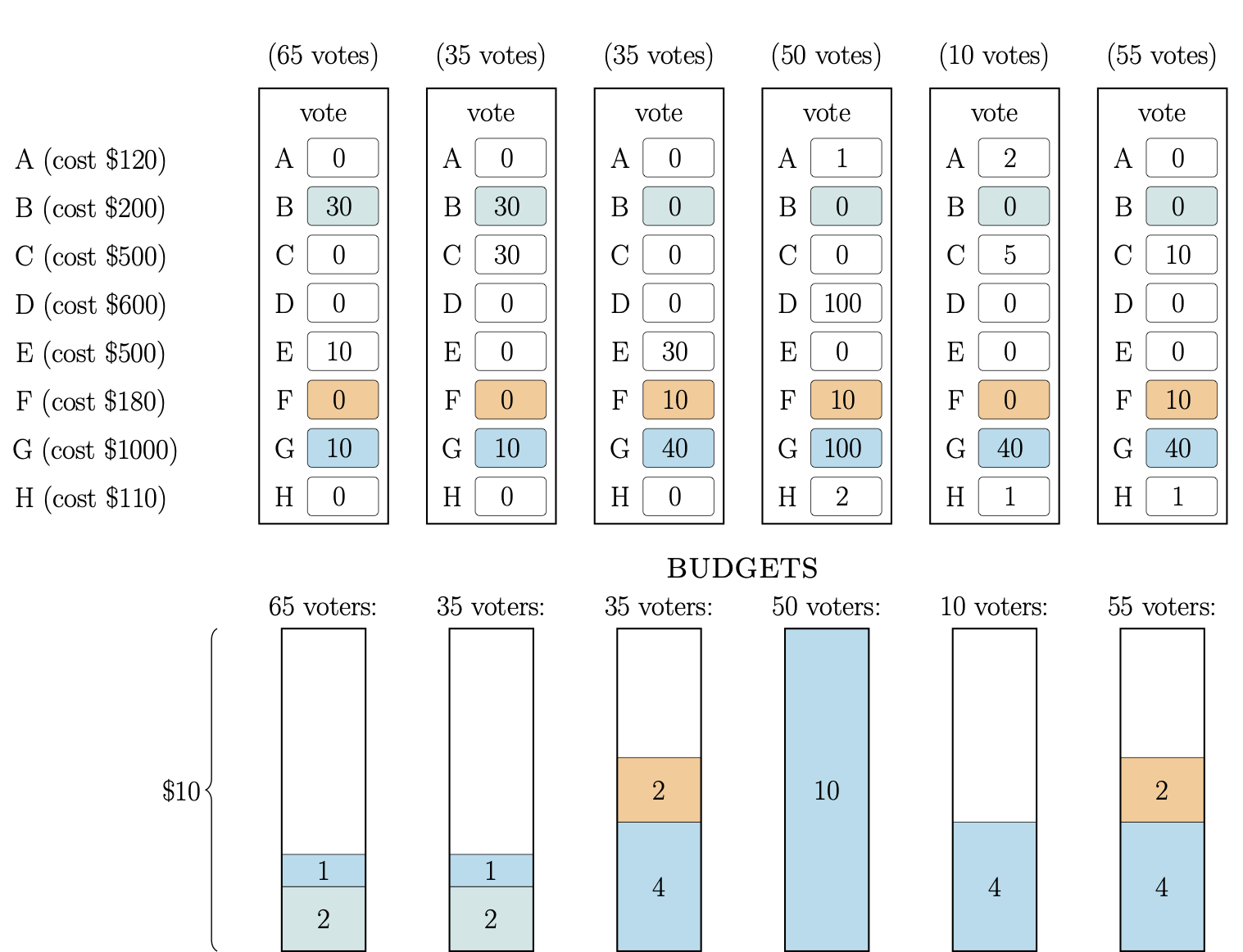
In the third round project F is selected. Every supporter of F pays an equal part of the price – except for voters from the fourth group, who have no money. If they had any, they would also need to participate. Nevertheless, the maximal payment-per-utility for project F is minimal (it equals 0.2), hence F is elected.

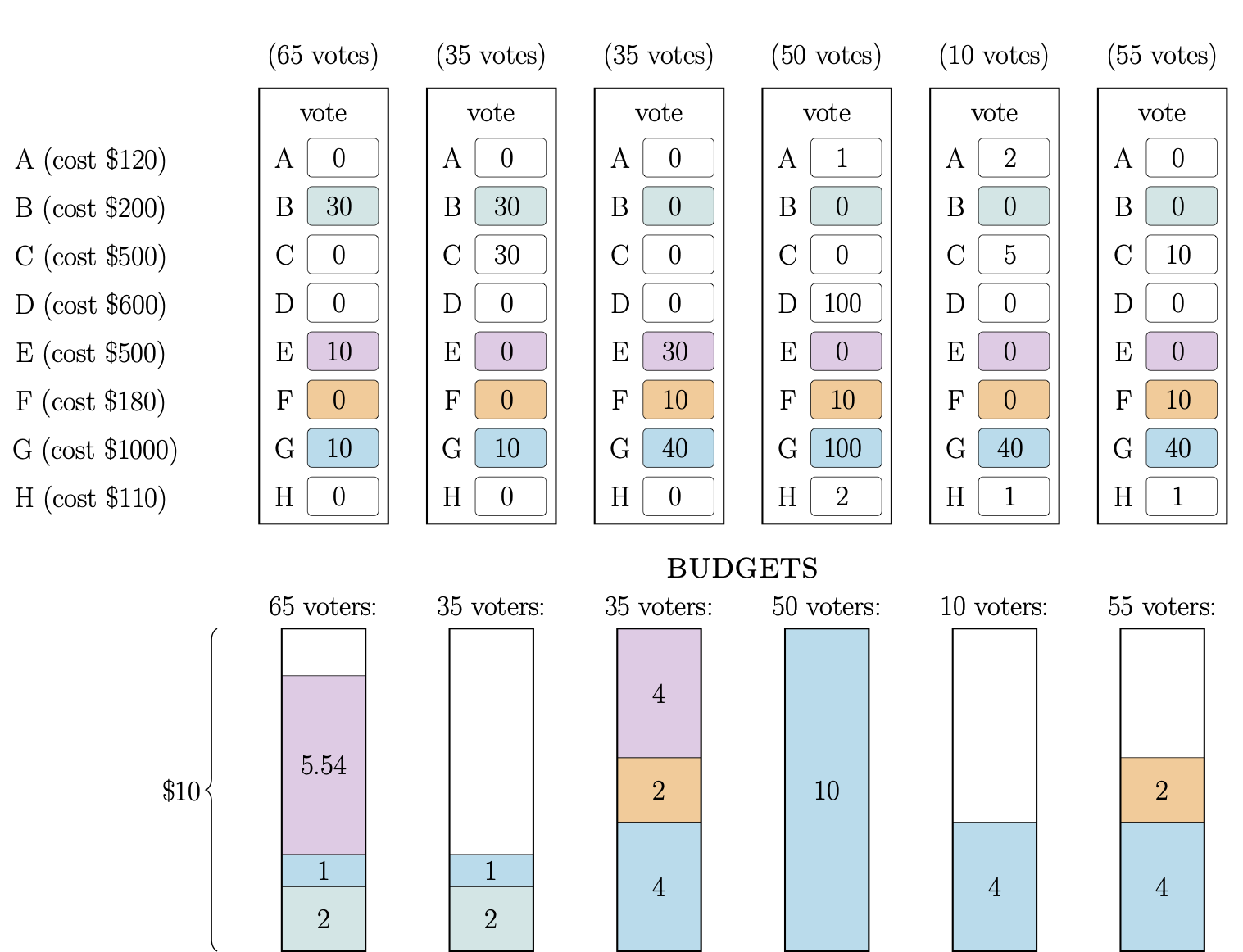
In the fourth round, project E is elected. Consider the payments presented in the picture and note that the voters from the third group have too little money to participate in paying proportionally to their utilities, yet they all still have $4 left. In such case, they pay all money they still have. The maximal payment-per-utility (paid by the voters from the first group) is minimal and equals circa 0.54.

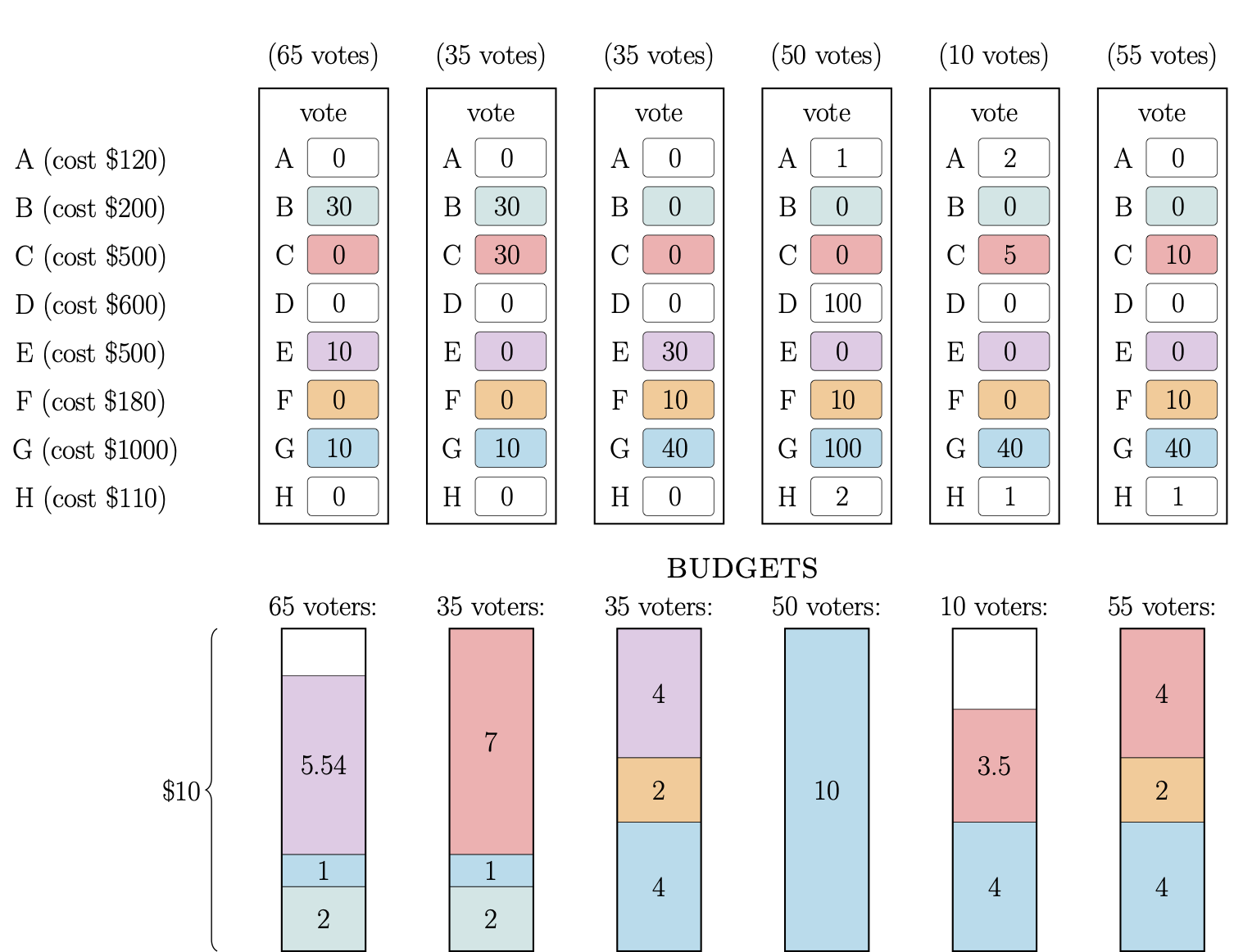
In the last step, project C is elected. The voters from the second and the sixth group have too little money to participate in paying proportionally to their utilities, hence they pay as much as possible. The maximal payment-per-utility is paid for the fifth group of voters and equals 0.7.

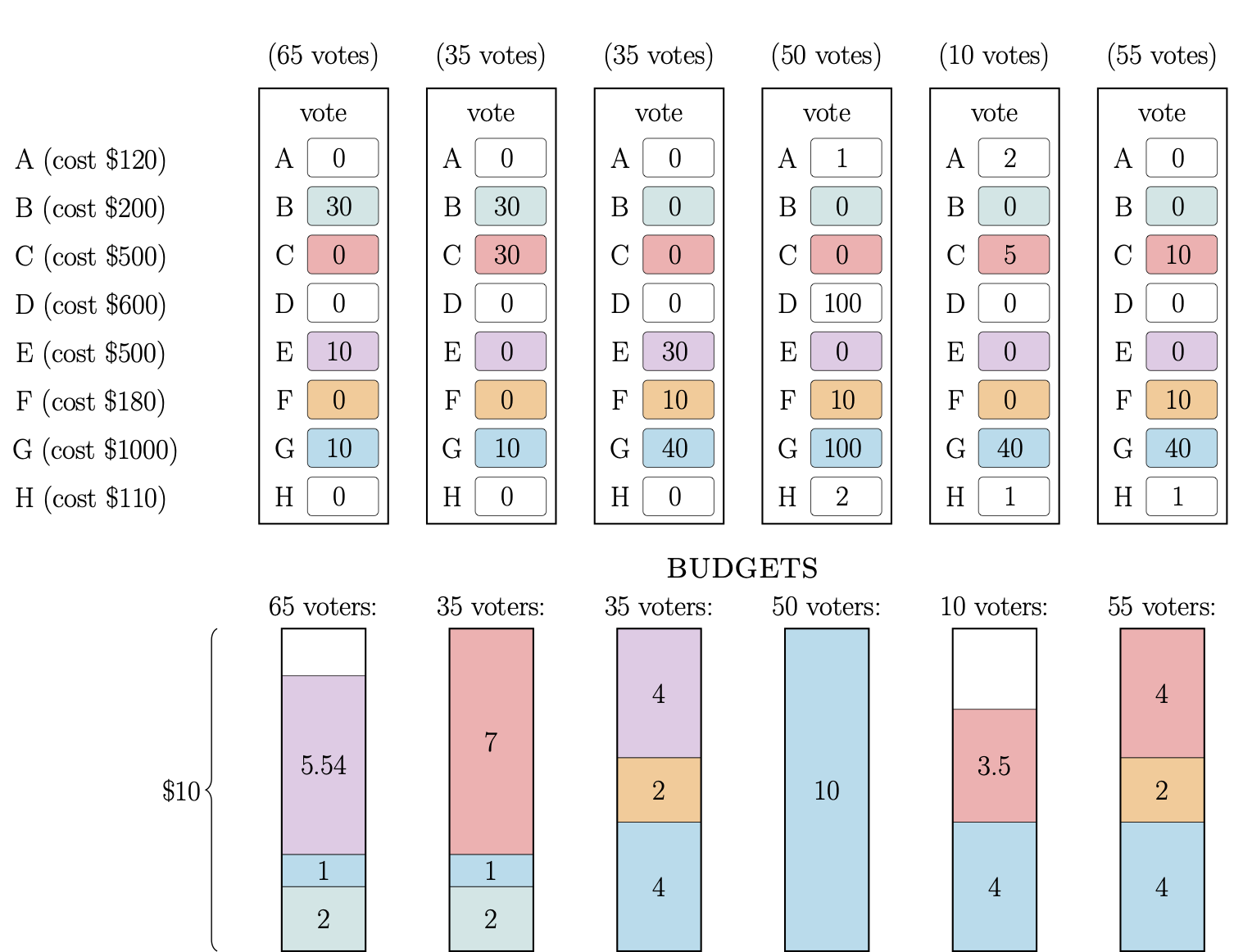
The rule spent $2380 out of $2500 in the budget. While the voters from the first and the fifth group have positive savings, no project can be afforded by their supporters. Hence the algorithm stops. The outcome can be further completed. According to the utilitarian strategy, project H would be selected as its cost per utility equals $110 / (2\cdot 50 + 1\cdot 10 + 1 \cdot 55)$ and is maximal across the projects that would fit within the budget constraint.

== Main loop: approval ballots (again) ==
The above description of MES with approval ballots can be seen as a special case of MES with cardinal ballots where agents have binary utilities, $u_i(p) = 1$ if project $p$ is approved by voter $i$, and $u_i(p) = 0$ otherwise. This assumes that the utility of a voter equals the number of approved selected projects. This definition typically results in selecting more but less expensive projects, as a project with a lower cost will typically be $\rho$-affordable for a smaller value of $\rho$.

Alternatively, one can assume cost utilities, $u_i(p) = \mathrm{cost}(p)$ if project $p$ is approved by voter $i$ and $u_i(p) = 0$ otherwise. This assumes that the utility of a voter equals the total amount of money spent on the projects supported by the voter. This assumption is commonly used in other methods of counting approval ballots for participatory budgeting, for example in the knapsack algorithm, and typically results in selecting fewer more expensive projects.

== Main loop: ranked ballots ==
Suppose voters vote by ranking the projects from the most to the least preferred one. Assuming lexicographic preferences, one can use the convention that $u_i(p)$ depends on the position of project $p$ in the voter's $i$ ranking, and that $u_i(p)/u_i(p') \to \infty$, whenever $i$ ranks $p$ as more preferred than $p'$. In this case, MES is defined as follows.

For each voter $i \in N$ let $\succ_i$ denote the ranking of voter $i$ over the projects. For example, $Y \succ_i X \succ_i Z$ means that $Y$ is the most preferred project from the perspective of voter $i$, $X$ is the voter's second most preferred project and $Z$ is the least preferred project. In this example we say that project $Y$ is ranked in the first position and write $\mathrm{pos}_i(Y) = 1$, project $X$ is ranked in the second position ($\mathrm{pos}_i(X) = 2$), and $Z$ in the third position ($\mathrm{pos}_i(Z) = 3$).

For each not-yet-selected project $p \in P$ we say that $p$ is $\delta$-affordable if the remaining budget of the voters who rank $p$ at position $\delta$ or better is greater than or equal to $\mathrm{cost}(p)$:

$$\begin{align}
\sum_{i \in N \colon \mathrm{pos}_i(p) \leq \delta} b_i \geq \mathrm{cost}(p) \text{.}
\end{align}$$

If there are affordable projects, then the rule picks the not-yet-selected project $p$ that is $\delta$-affordable for the lowest value of $\delta$. The budgets of the voters are updated accordingly. First, the cost is equally spread among the voters who rank $p$ at the first position. If the budgets of these voters are insufficient to cover the cost of the project, the remaining part of the cost is further spread equally among the voters who rank $p$ at the second position, etc. Formally we start with $\delta := 1$ and $\mathrm{cost} := \mathrm{cost}(p)$, and proceed in the loop:

1. If $\textstyle \sum_{i \in N \colon \mathrm{pos}_i(p) =\delta} b_i \geq \mathrm{cost}$ then we find $\rho$ such that $\textstyle \sum_{i \in N \colon \mathrm{pos}_i(p) =\delta} \min(\rho, b_i) =\mathrm{cost}$ and for each voter $i \in N$ with $\mathrm{pos}_i(p) =\delta$ we set $b_i := \max(0, b_i - \rho)$.
2. Otherwise, we update the cost: $\mathrm{cost} := \mathrm{cost} - \textstyle \sum_{i \in N \colon \mathrm{pos}_i(p) =\delta} b_i$. We charge the voters: for each voter $i \in N$ with $\mathrm{pos}_i(p) =\delta$ we set $b_i := 0$, and move to the next position $\delta := \delta + 1$.

== Completion methods ==
The method of equal shares can return a set of projects that does not exhaust the whole budget. There are multiple ways to use the unspent budget:

1. The utilitarian method: the projects $p$ are selected in the order of $\frac{\sum_{i \in N}u_i(p)}{\mathrm{cost}(p)}$ until no further project can be selected within the budget limit.
2. Adjusting initial budget: the initial budget can be adjusted to the highest possible value which makes the method select projects, whose total cost does not exceed the unadjusted budget.

== Comparison to other voting methods ==
In the context of committee elections, the method is often compared to proportional approval voting (PAV), since both methods are proportional (they satisfy the axiom of extended justified representation (EJR)). The difference between the two methods can be described as follow.

1. The method of equal shares (MES) is computable in polynomial time, and PAV is NP-hard to compute. The sequential variant of PAV is computable in polynomial time but does not satisfy justified representation.
2. PAV is Pareto-optimal, but MES is not.
3. MES is priceable. This means that it is possible to assign a fixed budget to each voter and split each voter's budget among candidates he approves, such that each elected candidate is "bought" by the candidates who approve him, and no unelected candidate can be bought by the remaining money of the voters who approve him. MES can be viewed as an implementation of Lindahl equilibrium in the discrete model, with the assumption that the customers sharing an item must pay the same price for the item.
4. MES extends to participatory budgeting and to cardinal ballots, whereas PAV does not satisfy extended justified representation when applied to either participatory budgeting or to cardinal ballots.

MES is similar to the Phragmen's sequential rule. The difference is that in MES the voters are given their budgets upfront, while in the Phragmen's sequential rule the voters earn money continuously over time. The methods compare as follows:

1. Both methods are computable in polynomial time, both are priceable, and both may fail Pareto-optimality.
2. MES satisfies EJR, while the Phragmen's sequential rule satisfies proportional justified representation, a weaker variant of the property.
3. The Phragmen's sequential rule satisfies committee monotonicity, while MES fails the property.
4. MES extends to participatory budgeting with cardinal ballots, which is not the case for the Phragmen's sequential rule.

MES with adjusting initial budget, PAV and Phragmen's voting rules can all be viewed as extensions of the D'Hondt method to the setting where the voters can vote for individual candidates rather than for political parties. MES further extends to participatory budgeting.

== Implementation ==
Below there is a Python implementation of the method that applies to participatory budgeting. For the model of committee elections, the rules is implemented as a part of the Python package abcvoting.

import math

def method_of_equal_shares(N, C, cost, u, b):
    """Method of Equal Shares

    Args:
      N:     a list of voters.
      C:     a list of projects (candidates).
      cost:  a dictionary that assigns each project its cost.
      b:     the total available budget.
      u:     a dictionary; u[c][i] is the value that voter i assigns to candidate c.
             an empty entry means that the corresponding value u[c][i] equals 0.
    """
    W = set()
    total_utility = {c: sum(u[c].values()) for c in C}
    supporters = {c: set([i for i in N if u[c][i] > 0]) for c in C}
    budget = {i: b / len(N) for i in N}
    while True:
        next_candidate = None
        lowest_rho = float("inf")
        for c in C.difference(W):
            if _leq(cost[c], sum([budget[i] for i in supporters[c]])):
                supporters_sorted = sorted(supporters[c], key=lambda i: budget[i] / u[c][i])
                price = cost[c]
                util = total_utility[c]
                for i in supporters_sorted:
                    if _leq(price * u[c][i], budget[i] * util):
                        break
                    price -= budget[i]
                    util -= u[c][i]
                rho = price / util \
                        if not math.isclose(util, 0) and not math.isclose(price, 0) \
                        else budget[supporters_sorted[-1]] / u[c][supporters_sorted[-1]]
                if rho < lowest_rho:
                    next_candidate = c
                    lowest_rho = rho
        if next_candidate is None:
            break
        W.add(next_candidate)
        for i in N:
            budget[i] -= min(budget[i], lowest_rho * u[next_candidate][i])
    return _complete_utilitarian(N, C, cost, u, b, W)  # one of the possible completions

def _complete_utilitarian(N, C, cost, u, b, W):
    util = {c: sum([u[c][i] for i in N]) for c in C}
    committee_cost = sum([cost[c] for c in W])
    while True:
        next_candidate = None
        highest_util = float("-inf")
        for c in C.difference(W):
            if _leq(committee_cost + cost[c], b):
                if util[c] / cost[c] > highest_util:
                    next_candidate = c
                    highest_util = util[c] / cost[c]
        if next_candidate is None:
            break
        W.add(next_candidate)
        committee_cost += cost[next_candidate]
    return W

def _leq(a, b):
    return a < b or math.isclose(a, b)

== Empirical support ==
Fairstein, Benade and Gal compare MES to greedy aggregation methods. They find that greedy aggregation leads to outcomes that are highly sensitive to the input format used and the fraction of the population that participates. In contrast, MES leads to outcomes that are not sensitive to the type of voting format used. This means that MES can be used with approval ballots, ordinal ballots or cardinal ballots without much difference in the outcome. These outcomes are stable even when only 25 to 50 percent of the population participates in the election.

Fairstein, Meir, Vilenchik and Gal study variants of MES both on real and synthetic datasets. They find that these variants do very well in practice, both with respect to social welfare and with respect to justified representation.

== Real-life applications ==
In 2023, MES was being used in a participatory budgeting program in the Polish city of Wieliczka. The program, known as Green Million (Zielony Milion), was set to distribute 1 million złoty to ecological projects proposed by residents of the city.

MES was also used in a participatory budgeting program in the Swiss cities of Aarau in 2023 (Stadtidee) and Winterthur, as well as the Dutch city of Assen.

== Problems ==
Papasotiropoulos, Pishbin, Skibski, Skowron and Was present several problems with MES, and with the EJR requirement in general.

=== Helenka paradox ===
The paradox was first discovered in participatory budgeting elections held in 2020 in Helenka, Poland. There were two projects with costs $310,000 and $6,000 respectively. There were 414 voters, of whom 403 approved only the $310,000 project and the other 11 approved only the $6,000 project. The total budget was $310,000. MES funds the $6,000 project and has no remaining budget to fund the $310,000 project, even though this project would satisfy many more voters. Moreover, only a small fraction of the budget is utilized. In fact, this is the only EJR allocation, so the same two problems would affect any other rule that guarantees EJR.

=== Tail utilities ===
This problem affects only MES with cardinal utilities. Suppose there are two projects with the same cost 1. There are 100 voters. 99 voters value project x at 100 and project y at 2; 1 voter values project x at 1 and project y at 2. The budget is 1. Here, MES would choose to fund project y, since it is 0.005-affordable – all voters would pay $0.005 for unit of utility. In contrast, project x is only 0.01-fundable, as the 1 voter would pay $0.01 for unit of utility. Even though the 99 voters would pay only $0.0001 for unit of utility, the single voter who would pay $0.01 makes MES prefer project y. Effectively, MES is egalitarian in that it maximizes the minimum utility of an agent (by minimizing the maximum payment of an agent).

== Fractional variants of MES ==
Some recent variants of MES can fund not only entire projects but also fractions of projects.

=== Fractional equal shares ===
Papasotiropoulos, Pishbin, Skibski, Skowron and Was describe a variant they call FrES (fractional equal shares). The idea is that, instead of funding an entire project, it is possible to fund a fraction f<1 of a project, for a fraction f of its cost, and for a fraction f of its utility. Formally, for any $\rho \ge 0$ and f in (0,1], we say that project $p$ is $(f,\rho)$-affordable if

$$\begin{align}
\sum_{i \in N} \min\left( b_i, \rho \cdot f\cdot u_i(p) \right) = f\cdot \mathrm{cost}(p) \text{.}
\end{align}$$

At each round, FrES selects a project p that is $(f,\rho)$-affordable for the lowest value of $\rho$. It then funds the largest possible fraction f of p.

Note that, when f is sufficiently small, the minimum in the above expression will always be $\rho \cdot f\cdot u_i(p)$. Hence, $\rho$ will always be equal to $\textrm{cost}(p) / \sum_{i \in N, b_i>0} u_i(p)$, and f will always be the minimum between the yet-unfunded fraction of p, and $\min_{i\in N, b_i>0} b_i / (\rho \cdot u_i(p))$.

They prove that FrES satisfies a fractional variant of EJR, which they call fractional EJR (see Justified representation#PB).

=== Generalized MES ===
Lu, Peters, Aziz, Bei and Suksompong present a variant of MES that can handle both indivisible projects (like the original MES) and divisible heterogeneous projects ("cakes"), as in cake sharing. They call it generalized MES. It works as follows.

- Each remaining cake is partitioned to intervals such that each voter either approves an entire interval or disapproves an entire interval. Each such interval is considered a single divisible candidate.
- A divisible candidate p=[x_{0},x_{1}] is considered $(x,\rho)$-affordable if
  $$\begin{align}
\sum_{i \in N, i \text{ approves } p} \min\left( b_i, \rho \cdot (x-x_0) \right) =x-x_0\text{.}
\end{align}$$
  This is equivalent to the definition used in FrES, where both the cost and the utility of each interval for its approvers are equal to its length.
- An indivisible candidate p is considered $\rho$-affordable if
  $$\begin{align}
\sum_{i \in N, i \text{ approves } p} \min\left( b_i, \rho \right) = 1 \text{.}
\end{align}$$
  This is equivalent to the definition used in standard MES, where both the cost and the utiltity of each indivisible candidate for its approvers are 1.

At each round, either a divisible candidate or an indivisible one are selected, depending on which one is $\rho$-affordable with the smaller $\rho$. In the former case, the chosen candidate is p=[x_{0},x] for the largest possible value of x for which it is still $(x,\rho)$-affordable.

Generalized MES with only divisible projects is equivalent to FrES with approval ballots and cost utilities.

They prove that generalized MES satisfies EJR-1 but not EJR-M. However, for divisible-only (cake sharing) instances it satisfies cake-EJR (EJR for L-cohesive groups with possibly non-integer L; it is equivalent to fractional EJR with approval ballots and cost utilities). Moreover, generalized MES has a proportionality degree of ~L/2.

== Other variants ==
=== Substitute goods ===
Fairstein, Meir and Gal extend MES to a setting in which some projects may be substitute goods.

=== Exact equal shares ===
Kraiczy, Robinson and Elkind present a variant of MES which they call exact equal shares (EES). In EES, all supporters of a project either pay exactly the same amount per unit utility, or zero. In other words, supporters with not enough money to contribute equally do not pay all their remaining money - they pay nothing. Formally, we say that project $p$ is $\rho$-affordable if there is a subset V of voters all of whom approve p, such that for all i in V, $\rho\cdot u_i(p) \leq b_i$ and

$$\begin{align}
\sum_{i \in V} \rho \cdot u_i(p) = \mathrm{cost}(p) \text{.}
\end{align}$$

In the special case of uniform utilities $u_i(p) = u(p)$ for all i, these conditions are equivalent to $\rho = \frac{\operatorname{cost}(p)}{|V| u(p)}$ and $\rho u(p) \leq b_i$, that is, $\frac{\operatorname{cost}(p)}{|V|}\leq b_i$.

The main advantage of EES over MES is that, due to its simplicity, the completion method of increasing the initial budget can be implemented in polynomial time. Hence, it is possible to efficiently use this method to obtain high budget utilization.
