= Dichotomous preferences =

Two-leveled set of preferences in economics

In economics, dichotomous preferences (DP) are preference relations that divide the set of alternatives to two subsets, "Good" and "Bad".

From ordinal utility perspective, DP means that for every two alternatives $X,Y$:

$$X \preceq Y
\iff
X \in Bad
\text{ or }
Y \in Good$$
$$X \prec Y
\iff
X \in Bad
\text{ and }
Y \in Good$$

From cardinal utility perspective, DP means that for each agent, there are two utility levels: low and high, and for every alternative $X$:

$$u(X) = u_{low} \iff X\in Bad$$
$$u(X) = u_{high} \iff X\in Good$$

A common way to let people express dichotomous preferences is using approval ballots, in which each voter can either "approve" or "reject" each alternative.

== In fair item assignment ==
In the context of fair item assignment, DP can be represented by a mathematical logic formula: for every agent, there is a formula that describes his desired bundles. An agent is satisfied if-and-only-if he receives a bundle that satisfies the formula.

A special case of DP is single-mindedness. A single-minded agent wants a very specific bundle; he is happy if-and-only-if he receives this bundle, or any bundle that contains it. Such preferences appear in real-life, for example, in the problem of allocating classrooms to schools: each school i needs a number d_{i} of classes; the school has utility 1 if it gets all d_{i} classes in the same place and 0 otherwise.

== Collective choice under DP ==
=== Without transfers ===
Suppose a mechanism selects a lottery over outcomes. The utility of each agent, under this mechanism, is the probability that one of his Good outcomes is selected. The utilitarian mechanism averages over outcomes with the highest approval ratings. It is Pareto efficient, strategyproof, fair to voters, and fair to candidates.

However, it is impossible to achieve all of these properties in addition to proportionality, and as a result proportional representation systems cannot be strategyproof with dichotomous preferences.

=== With transfers ===
Suppose all agents have DP cardinal utility, where each agent is characterized by a single number $u_{high}$ so that $u_{low}=0$. Then a condition called generation monotonicity is necessary and sufficient for implementation by a truthful mechanisms in any dichotomous domain (see Monotonicity (mechanism design)). If such a domain satisfies a richness condition, then a weaker version of generation monotonicity, 2-generation monotonicity (equivalent to 3-cycle monotonicity), is necessary and sufficient for implementation. This result can be used to derive the optimal mechanism in a one-sided matching problem with agents who have dichotomous types.
