= Edith Elkind =

Estonian computer scientist

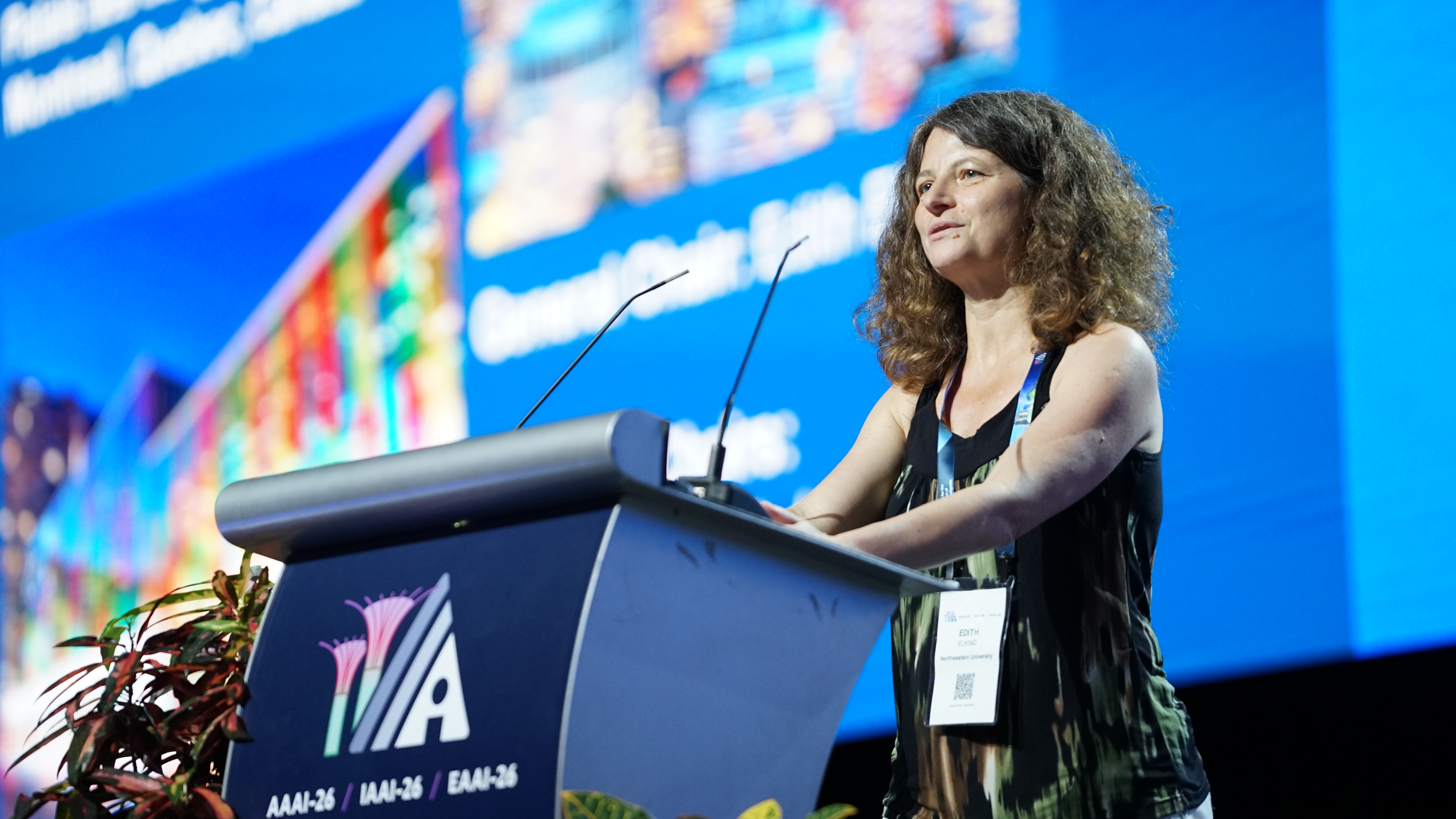
Elkind at AAAI 2026

Edith Elkind is an Estonian computer scientist and the Ginni Rometty Professor of Computer Science at Northwestern University in Evanston. She is known for her work in algorithmic game theory and computational social choice.

== Education and career ==
As a high school student, Elkind competed for the Estonian team in the International Mathematical Olympiads in 1992 and 1993. She earned a master's degree at Moscow State University in 1998, and completed her Ph.D. in 2005 from Princeton University. Her dissertation, Computational Issues in Optimal Auction Design, was supervised by Amit Sahai.

After completing her Ph.D., she was a postdoctoral researcher at the University of Warwick, the University of Liverpool, and the Hebrew University of Jerusalem. She became a lecturer at the University of Southampton and an assistant professor at Nanyang Technological University. She moved to Oxford in 2013, as a non-tutorial fellow of Balliol College, Oxford. She was awarded the title of professor by Oxford in 2016. She moved to Northwestern University in November 2024.

== Book ==
With Georgios Chalkiadakis and Michael J. Wooldridge, Elkind is an author of Computational Aspects of Cooperative Game Theory (Morgan & Claypool, 2012).

== Honours ==
Elkind is a Fellow of the European Association for Artificial Intelligence.
