= Approval ballot =

An approval ballot, also called an unordered ballot, is a ballot in which a voter may vote for any number of candidates simultaneously, rather than for just one candidate. Candidates that are selected in a voter's ballot are said to be approved by the voter; the other candidates are said to be disapproved or rejected. Approval ballots do not let the voters specify a preference-order among the candidates they approve; hence the name unordered. This is in contrast to ranked ballots, which are ordered. There are several electoral systems that use approval balloting; they differ in the way in which the election outcome is determined:

- In approval voting, there is a single winner, and he/she is the candidate with the largest number of votes.
- In multiple non-transferable vote (also called block voting) there is a fixed number (say k) of winners, and they are the k candidates with the largest number of votes.
- In other multiwinner approval voting systems, there is a fixed number k of winners, but they are determined by more complex procedures, in order to guarantee such properties as justified representation.

Approval ballots let the voters express dichotomous preferences.

== Description ==
On an approval ballot, the voter can select any number of candidates.

Approval voting ballots show a list of the candidates running for that seat for each office being contested. Next to each name is a checkbox (or another similar way to mark "Yes" or "No" for that candidate).

Each candidate may be treated as a separate question: "Do you approve of this person for the job?" Approval voting lets each voter indicate support for one, some, or all candidates.

Each ballot separates candidates into two groups: those supported and those that are not. Each candidate approved is considered preferred to any candidate not approved, while the voter's preferences among approved candidates is unspecified, and likewise, the voter's preferences among unapproved candidates is also unspecified.

== Ballot types ==
Approval ballots can be of at least four semi-distinct forms. The simplest form is a blank ballot on which voters hand-write the names of the candidates they support. A more structured ballot lists all candidates, and voters mark each candidate they support. A more explicit structured ballot can list the candidates and provide two choices by each. (Candidate list ballots can include spaces for write-in candidates as well.)

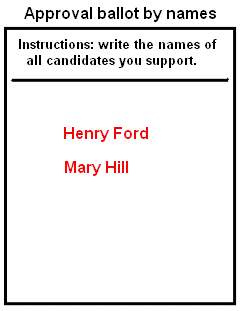

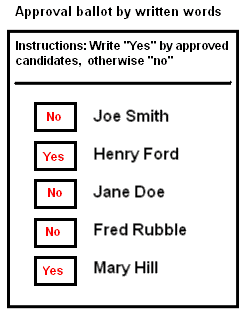

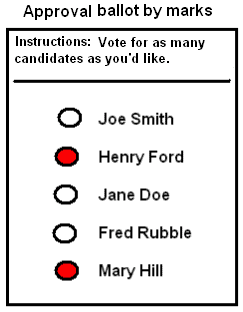

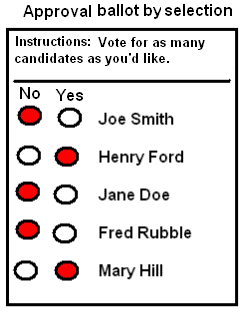

All four ballots are theoretically equivalent. The more structured ballots may aid voters in offering clear votes so they explicitly know all their choices. The Yes/No format can help to detect an "undervote" when a candidate is left unmarked and allow the voter a second chance to confirm the ballot markings are correct. The "single bubble" format is incapable of producing invalid ballots (which might otherwise be rejected in counting).

Unless the second or fourth format is used, fraudulently adding votes to an approval voting ballot does not invalidate the ballot (that is, it does not make it appear inconsistent). Thus, approval voting raises the importance of ensuring that the "chain of custody" of ballots is secure.
