= Price of fairness =

In the theory of fair division, the price of fairness (POF) is the ratio of the largest economic welfare attainable by a division to the economic welfare attained by a fair division. The POF is a quantitative measure of the loss of welfare that society has to take in order to guarantee fairness.

In general, the POF is defined by the following formula:
$$POF=\frac{\max_{D\in \text{Divisions}}{(\mathrm{welfare}(D))}}{\max_{D\in \text{Fair Divisions}}{(\mathrm{welfare}(D))}}$$

The exact price varies greatly based on the kind of division, the kind of fairness and the kind of social welfare we are interested in.

The most well-studied type of social welfare is utilitarian social welfare, defined as the sum of the (normalized) utilities of all agents. Another type is egalitarian social welfare, defined as the minimum (normalized) utility per agent.

== Numeric example ==
In this example we focus on the utilitarian price of proportionality, or UPOP.

Consider a heterogeneous land-estate that has to be divided among 100 partners, all of whom value it as 100 (or the value is normalized to 100). First, let's look at some extreme cases.

- The maximum possible utilitarian welfare is 10000. This welfare is attainable only in the very rare case where each partner wants a different part of the land.
- In a proportional division, each partner receives a value of at least 1, so the utilitarian welfare is at least 100.

=== Upper bound ===
The extreme cases described above already give us a trivial upper bound: UPOP ≤ 10000/100 = 100. But we can get a tighter upper bound.

Assume that we have an efficient division of a land-estate to 100 partners, with a utilitarian welfare U. We want to convert it to a proportional division. To do this, we group the partners according to their current value:

- Partners whose current value is at least 10 are called fortunate .
- The other partners are called unfortunate.

There are two cases:

- If there are less than 10 fortunate partners, then just discard the current division and make a new proportional division (e.g. using the last diminisher protocol). In a proportional division, every partner receives a value of at least 1, so the total value is at least 100. The value of the original division is less than (10*100+90*10)=1900, so the UPOP is at most 19.
- If there are at least 10 fortunate partners, then create a proportional division using the following variant of the last diminisher protocol:
  - Each fortunate partner in turn cuts 0.1 of his share and lets the other unfortunate partners diminish it. Either he or one of the unfortunate partners receives this share.
  - This goes on until each of the (at most) 90 unfortunate partner has a share. Now each of the (at least) 10 fortunate partners has at least 0.1 of his previous value, and each of the unfortunate partners has at least his previous value, so the UPOP is at most 10.

To summarize: the UPOP is always less than 20, regardless of the value measures of the partners.

=== Lower bound ===
The UPOP can be as low as 1. For example, if all partners have the same value measure, then in any division, regardless of fairness, the utilitarian welfare is 100. Hence, UPOP=100/100=1.

However, we are interested on a worst-case UPOP, i.e., a combination of value measures in which the UPOP is large. Here is such an example.

Assume there are two types of partners:

- 90 uniform partners who value the entire land uniformly (i.e. the value of a piece is proportional to its size).
- 10 focused partners, each of whom values only a single district that covers 0.1 of the land.

Consider the two following partitions:

- Fair division: Divide the land uniformly, giving each partner 0.01 of the land, where the focused partners each receive their 0.01 in their desired district. This division is fair. The value of each uniform partner is 1, while the value of each focused partner is 10, so the utilitarian welfare is 190.
- Efficient division: Divide the entire land to the focused partners, giving each partner his entire desired district. The utilitarian welfare is 100*10=1000.

In this example, the UPOP is 1000/190=5.26. Thus 5.26 is a lower bound on the worst-case UPOP (where the "worst-case" is taken over all possible combinations of value measures).

=== Combined ===
Combining all the results, we get that the worst-case UPOP is bounded between 5 and 20.

This example is typical of the arguments used to bound the POF. To prove a lower bound, it is sufficient to describe a single example; to prove an upper bound, an algorithm or another sophisticated argument should be presented.

== POF in cake-cutting ==
Price-of-fairness has been studied extensively in various settings related to fair cake-cutting.

=== Cake-cutting with general pieces ===
The numeric example described above can be generalized from 100 to n partners, giving the following bounds for the worst-case UPOP:

√n/2 ≤ UPOP ≤ 2√n-1
UPOP = Θ(√n)

For two partners, a more detailed calculation gives a bound of: 8-4*√3 ≅ 1.07.

When the entire cake is divided, an envy-free division is always proportional. Hence the lower bound on the worst-case UPOP (√n/2) applies here too. On the other hand, as an upper bound we only have a weak bound of n-1/2. Hence:

√n/2 ≤ UPOV ≤ n-1/2
Ω(√n) ≤ UPOV ≤ O(n)

For two partners, a more detailed calculation gives a bound of: 8-4*√3 ≅ 1.07.

$${(n+1)^2 \over 4n}\leq UPOQ \leq n$$
$$UPOQ = \Theta(n)$$

For two partners, a more detailed calculation gives a bound of: 9/8=1.125.

=== Cake-cutting with connected pieces ===
The problem of fair cake-cutting has a variant in which the pieces must be connected. In this variant, both the nominator and the denominator in the POF formula are smaller (since the maximum is taken over a smaller set), so a priori it is not clear whether the POF should be smaller or larger than in the disconnected case.

Aumann and Dombb prove the following results for utilitarian welfare:

UPOP = Θ(√n)

UPOV = Θ(√n)

n-1+1/n ≤ UPOQ ≤ n
UPOQ = Θ(n)

As for egalitarian welfare, in a proportional division, the value of each partner is at least 1/n of the total. In particular, the value of the least fortunate agent (which is called the egalitarian welfare of the division) is at least 1/n. This means that in an egalitarian-optimal division, the egalitarian welfare is at least 1/n, and so an egalitarian-optimal division is always proportional. Hence, the egalitarian price of proportionality (EPOP) is 1:

EPOP = 1

Similar considerations apply to the egalitarian price of equitability (EPOQ):

EPOQ = 1

The egalitarian price of envy-freeness is much larger:

EPOV = n/2

This is an interesting result, as it implies that insistence on the criterion of envy-freeness increases the social gaps and harms the most unfortunate citizens. The criterion of proportionality is much less harmful.

Instead of calculating the loss of welfare due to fairness, we can calculate the loss of fairness due to welfare optimization:

proportional-price-of-egalitarianism = 1
envy-price-of-egalitarianism = n-1
proportional-price-of-utilitarianism = infinity
envy-price-of-egalitarianism = infinity

=== Cake-cutting with geometric constraints ===
Algorithms for redividing the cake can be used to obtain improved bounds on the price of fairness for both one-dimensional and two-dimensional cakes with various geometric constraints.

=== Chore-cutting with general pieces ===
For the problem of cake-cutting when the "cake" is undesirable (e.g. lawn-mowing), we have the following results:

(n+1)^2/4n ≤ UPOP ≤ n; for two people: 9/8
(n+1)^2/4n ≤ UPOV ≤ infinity; for two people: 9/8
UPOQ=n

=== Chore-cutting with connected pieces ===
A brief summary of the results:

n/2 ≤ UPOP ≤ n
UPOV = infinity
UPOQ = n

EPOP = 1
EPOV = infinity
EPOQ = 1

== POF in item allocation ==
POF has also been studied in the context of fair allocation of indivisible items.

=== Indivisible goods allocation ===
For indivisible goods allocation, an assignment satisfying proportionality, envy-freeness, or equitability does not always exist (for a simple example, imagine two partners trying to divide a single valuable item). See also fair item allocation. Consequently, in the price of fairness calculations, the instances in which no assignment satisfies the relevant fairness notion are not considered. A brief summary of the results:

UPOP = n - 1 + 1/n; for two people: 3/2.
(3n+7)/9-O(1/n) ≤ UPOV ≤ n-1/2; for two people: 3/2
UPOQ=Infinity; for two people: 2

=== Indivisible bads allocation ===
UPOP = n
UPOV = infinity
UPOQ = infinity

=== Indivisible goods allocation with connected blocks ===
As in cake-cutting, for indivisible item assignment there is a variant where the items lie on a line and each assigned piece must form a block on the line. A brief summary of the results:

UPOP = n - 1 + 1/n
UPOV = Θ(√n)
UPOQ = infinity; for two people: 3/2

EPOP = 1
EPOV = n/2
EPOQ = infinity; for two people: 1

== POF in homogeneous resource allocation ==
The price of fairness has also been studied in the contest of the allocation of homogeneous divisible resources, such as oil or woods. Known results are:

UPOV = UPOP = Θ(√n)

This is because the rule of competitive equilibrium from equal incomes yields an envy-free allocation, and its utilitarian price is O(√n).

== POF in voting ==
Michorzewsk, Peters and Skowron study the price of fairness in fractional approval voting. In particular, they study how much utilitarian social welfare is lost in rules that guarantee fairness, with respect to the utilitarian-optimal allocation attained by simply giving all budget to the candidate with the highest number of votes. They prove that the price is in $\Theta(\sqrt{m})$ both for weak axioms such as individual fair share, and for stronger axioms such as the core. They also present a family of rules that interpolate between the utilitarian rule (which is efficient but not fair) and the Nash welfare rule (which is fair but not efficient).

Elkind, Faliszewski, Igarashi, Manurangsi, Schmidt-Kraepelin and Suksompong study the price of justified representation - the loss in the average satisfaction due to the requirement to have a justified representation in multiwinner approval voting.

== POF in other contexts ==
The price of fairness has been studied in the context of the fair subset sum problem.

== See also ==
- Economic efficiency
- Price of anarchy
