= Fractional social choice =

Fractional social choice (also called stochastic, probabilistic or weighted social choice) is a branch of social choice theory in which the collective decision is not a single alternative, but rather a weighted sum of two or more alternatives. For example, if society has to choose between three candidates (A, B, or C), then in standard social choice exactly one of these candidates is chosen. By contrast, in fractional social choice it is possible to choose any linear combination of these, e.g. "2/3 of A and 1/3 of B".

A common interpretation of the weighted sum is as a lottery, in which candidate A is chosen with probability 2/3 and candidate B is chosen with probability 1/3. The rule can also be interpreted as a recipe for sharing, for example:

- Time-sharing: candidate A is (deterministically) chosen for 2/3 of the time while candidate B is chosen for 1/3 of the time.
- Budget-distribution: candidate A receives 2/3 of the budget while candidate B receives 1/3 of the budget.
- Fair division with different entitlements can also be used to divide a heterogeneous resource between candidates A and B, with their entitlements being 2/3 and 1/3.

== Formal definitions ==
There is a finite set of alternatives (also called: candidates), and a finite set of voters (also called: agents). Voters may have different preferences over the alternatives. The agents' preferences can be expressed in several ways:

- Dichotomous preferences - each voter has a set of "approved candidates" who are all equivalent in his eyes. This model is elaborated in the page on fractional approval voting.
- Preference relations - each voter has a ranking of the candidates. The relation can be strict or weak. Strict means that there are no "ties" - the agent always prefers one candidate or another. Weak means that there may be ties - the agent might be indifferent between two or more candidates.
- Ideal distributions - each voter has in mind an ideal distribution of the probability/time/budget among the candidates. This model is elaborated in the page on Budget-proposal aggregation.

A random social choice function (RSCF) takes as input the set of voters' preference relations. It returns as output a "mixture" - a vector p of real numbers in [0,1], one number for each candidate, such that the sum of numbers is 1. This mixture can be interpreted as a random variable (a lottery), whose value equals each candidate x with probability p(x). It can also be interpreted as a deterministic assignment of a fractional share to each candidate.

Since the voters express preferences over single candidates only, in order to evaluate RSCFs one needs to "lift" these preferences to preferences over mixtures. This lifting process is often called a lottery extension, and it results in one of several stochastic orderings.

== Properties ==
=== Basic properties ===
Two basic desired properties of RSCFs are anonymity - the names of the voters do not matter, and neutrality - the names of the outcomes do not matter. Anonymity and neutrality cannot always be satisfied by a deterministic social choice function. For example, if there are two voters and two alternatives A and B, and each voter wants a different alternative, then the only anonymous and neutral mixture is 1/2*A+1/2*B. Therefore, the use of mixtures is essential to guarantee the basic fairness properties.

=== Consistency properties ===
The following properties involve changes in the set of voters or the set of alternatives.

Condorcet consistency - if there exists a Condorcet winner, then the function returns a degenerate mixture in which this winner gets 1 and the other alternatives get 0 (that is, the Condorcet winner is chosen with probability 1).

Agenda consistency - let p be a mixture, and let A,B be sets of alternatives that contain the support of p. Then, the function returns p for A union B, iff it returns p for A and for B. This property was called expansion/contraction by Sen.

Population consistency - if the function returns a mixture p for two disjoint sets of voters, then it returns the same p for their union.

Independence of clones (also called cloning consistency) - if an alternative is "cloned", such that all voters rank all its clones one near the other, then the weight (=probability) of all the other alternatives in the returned mixture is not affected.

- A stronger variant of it is composition consistency - it also requires that, in each component, the weight of each alternative is proportional to its weight when the component is considered in isolation.

These properties guarantee that a central planner cannot perform simple manipulations such as splitting alternatives, cloning alternatives, or splitting the population.

Note that consistency properties depend only on the rankings of individual alternatives - they do not require ranking of mixtures.

=== Mixture-comparison properties ===
The following properties involve comparisons of mixtures. To define them exactly, one needs an assumption on how voters rank mixtures. This requires a stochastic ordering on the lotteries. Several such orderings exist; the most common in social choice theory, in order of strength, are DD (deterministic dominance), BD (bilinear dominance), SD (stochastic dominance) and PC (pairwise-comparison dominance). See stochastic ordering for definitions and examples.

Efficiency - no mixture is better for at least one voter and at least as good for all voters. One can define DD-efficiency, BD-efficiency, SD-efficiency, PC-efficiency, and ex-post efficiency (the final outcome is always efficient).

Strategyproofness - reporting false preferences does not lead to a mixture that is better for the voter. Again, one can define DD-strategyproofness, BD-strategyproofness, SD-strategyproofness and PC-strategyproofness.

Participation - abstaining from participation does not lead to a mixture that is better for the voter. Again, one can define DD-participation, BD-participation, SD-participation and PC-participation.

== Common functions ==
Some commonly used rules for random social choice are:

Random dictatorship - a voter is selected at random, and determines the outcome. If the preferences are strict, this yields a mixture in which the weight of each alternative is exactly proportional to the number of voters who rank it first. If the preferences are weak, and the chosen voter is indifferent between two or more best options, then a second voter is selected at random to choose among them, and so on. This extension is called random serial dictatorship. It satisfies ex-post efficiency, strong SD-strategyproofness, very-strong-SD-participation, agenda-consistency, and cloning-consistency. It fails Condorcet consistency, composition consistency, and (with weak preferences) population consistency.

Max Borda - returns a mixture in which all alternatives with the highest Borda count have an equal weight, and all other alternatives have a weight of 0. In other words, it picks randomly one of the Borde winners (other score functions can be used instead of Borda). It satisfies SD-efficiency, strong-SD participation, and population-consistency, but does not satisfy any form of strategyproofness, or any other consistency.

Proportional Borda - returns a mixture in which the weight of each alternative is proportional to its Borda count. In other words, it randomizes between all alternatives, where the probability of each alternative is proportional to its score (other score functions can be used instead of Borda). It satisfies strong SD-strategyproofness, strong SD-participation, and population consistency, but not any form of efficiency, or any other consistency.

Maximal lotteries - a rule based on pairwise comparisons of alternatives. For any two alternatives x,y, we compute how many voters prefer x to y, and how many voters prefer y to x, and let M_{xy} be the difference. The resulting matrix M is called the majority margin matrix. A mixture p is called maximal iff $p^T M \geq 0$. When interpreted as a lottery, it means that p is weakly preferred to any other lottery by an expected majority of voters (the expected number of agents who prefer the alternative returned by p to that returned by any other lottery q, is at least as large as the expected number of agents who prefer the alternative returned by q to that returned by p). A maximal lottery is the continuous analogue of a Condorcet winner. However, while a Condorcet winner might not exist, a maximal lottery always exists. This follows from applying the Minimax theorem to an appropriate symmetric two-player zero-sum game. It satisfies PC-efficiency, DD-strategyproofness, PC-participation, and all consistency properties - particularly, Condorcet consistency.

== See also ==
- Fractional approval voting
- Participation incentives in fractional social choice.
