= Coherence (fairness) =

Criterion for evaluating rules for fair division

Coherence, also called uniformity or consistency, is a criterion for evaluating rules for fair division. Coherence requires that the outcome of a fairness rule is fair not only for the overall problem, but also for each sub-problem. Every part of a fair division should be fair.

The coherence requirement was first studied in the context of apportionment. In this context, failure to satisfy coherence is called the new states paradox: when a new U.S. state enters the union, and the number of seats in the House of Representatives is enlarged to accommodate the number of seats allocated to this new state, some other unrelated states are affected. Coherence is also relevant to other fair division problems, such as bankruptcy problems.

== Definition ==
There is a resource to allocate, denoted by $h$. For example, it can be an integer representing the number of seats in a house of representatives. The resource should be allocated between some $n$ agents. For example, these can be federal states or political parties. The agents have different entitlements, denoted by a vector $t_1,\ldots,t_n$. For example, t_{i} can be the fraction of votes won by party i. An allocation is a vector $a_1,\ldots,a_n$ with $\sum_{i=1}^n a_i = h$. An allocation rule is a rule that, for any $h$ and entitlement vector $t_1,\ldots,t_n$, returns an allocation vector $a_1,\ldots,a_n$.

An allocation rule is called coherent (or uniform) if, for every subset S of agents, if the rule is activated on the subset of the resource $h_S := \sum_{i\in S} a_i$, and on the entitlement vector $(t_i)_{i\in S}$, then the result is the allocation vector $(a_i)_{i\in S}$. That is: when the rule is activated on a subset of the agents, with the subset of resources they received, the result for them is the same.

=== Handling ties ===
In general, an allocation rule may return more than one allocation (in case of a tie). In this case, the definition should be updated. Denote the allocation rule by $M$, and Denote by $M\big(h; (t_i)_{i=1}^n\big)$ the set of allocation vectors returned by $M$ on the resource $h$ and entitlement vector $t_1, \ldots, t_n$. The rule $M$ is called coherent if the following holds for every allocation vector $(a_i)_{i=1}^n \in M\big(h; (t_i)_{i=1}^n\big)$ and any subset S of agents:

- $(a_i)_{i\in S} \in M\Big(\sum_{i\in S} a_i; (t_i)_{i\in S}\Big)$. That is, every part of every possible solution to the grand problem, is a possible solution to the sub-problem.
- For every $(b_i)_{i\in S} \in M\Big(\sum_{i\in S} a_i; (t_i)_{i\in S}\Big)$ and $(c_i)_{i\notin S} \in M\Big(\sum_{i\notin S} a_i; (t_i)_{i\notin S}\Big)$, we have $[(b_i)_{i\in S}, (c_i)_{i\notin S}] \in M\big(h; (t_i)_{i=1}^n\big)$. That is, if there are other (tied) solutions to the sub-problems, then putting them instead of the original solutions to the sub-problems yield other (tied) solutions to the grand problem.

== Coherence in apportionment ==
In apportionment problems, the resource to allocate is discrete, for example, the seats in a parliament. Therefore, each agent must receive an integer allocation.

=== Non-coherent methods: the new state paradox ===
One of the most intuitive rules for apportionment of seats in a parliament is the largest remainder method (LRM). This method dictates that the entitlement vector should be normalized such that the sum of entitlements equals $h$ (the total number of seats to allocate). Then each agent should get his normalized entitlement (often called quota) rounded down. If there are remaining seats, they should be allocated to the agents with the largest remainder – the largest fraction of the entitlement. Surprisingly, this rule is not coherent. As a simple example, suppose $h = 5$ and the normalized entitlements of Alice, Bob and Chana are 0.4, 1.35, 3.25 respectively. Then the unique allocation returned by LRM is 1, 1, 3 (the initial allocation is 0, 1, 3, and the extra seat goes to Alice, since her remainder 0.4 is largest). Now, suppose that we activate the same rule on Alice and Bob alone, with their combined allocation of 2. The normalized entitlements are now 0.4/1.75 × 2 ≈ 0.45 and 1.35/1.75 × 2 ≈ 1.54. Therefore, the unique allocation returned by LRM is 0, 2 rather than 1, 1. This means that in the grand solution 1, 1, 3, the internal division between Alice and Bob does not follow the principle of largest remainders – it is not coherent.

Another way to look at this non-coherence is as follows. Suppose that the house size is 2, and there are two states A, B with quotas 0.4, 1.35. Then the unique allocation given by LRM is 0, 2. Now, a new state C joins the union, with quota 3.25. It is allocated 3 seats, and the house size is increased to 5 to accommodate these new seats. This change should not affect the existing states A and B. In fact, with the LRM, the existing states are affected: state A gains a seat, while state B loses a seat. This is called the new state paradox.

The new state paradox was actually observed in 1907, when Oklahoma became a state. It was given a fair share 5 of seats, and the total number of seats increased by that number, from 386 to 391 members. After recomputation of apportionment affected the number of seats because of other states: New York lost a seat, while Maine gained one.

=== Coherent methods ===
Every divisor method is coherent. This follows directly from their description as picking sequences: at each iteration, the next agent to pick an item is the one with the highest ratio (entitlement / divisor). Therefore, the relative priority ordering between agents is the same even if we consider a subset of the agents.

=== Properties of coherent methods ===
When coherency is combined with other natural requirements, it characterizes a structured class of apportionment methods. Such characterizations were proved by various authors. All results assume that the rules are homogeneous (i.e. it depends only on the percentage of votes for each party, not on the total number of votes).

- If a coherent apportionment rule is balanced and concordant, then it is a divisor method.
- If a coherent apportionment rule is anonymous and balanced, then it is a rank-index method (a super-class of divisor methods). The opposite is also true: among the anonymous and balanced methods, a method is coherent if and only if it is a rank-index method.
- If a coherent apportionment rule is anonymous, concordant and weakly exact, then it is a divisor method.
- Balinsky and Rachev proved that if a coherent apportionment rule is anonymous, order-preserving, weakly exact, and complete, then it is a divisor method.
- If a coherent apportionment rule is anonymous and balanced, then it is house-monotone.
  - if, in addition, it is also concordant, it is vote-ratio monotone.
  - if, in addition, it is also strongly exact, then it is a divisor method.
- Young proved that the unique apportionment method that is a coherent extension of the natural two-party apportionment rule of rounding to the nearest integer is the Webster method.

== Coherence in bankruptcy problems ==
In bankruptcy problems, the resource to allocate is continuous, for example, the amount of money left by a debtor. Each agent can get any fraction of the resource. However, the sum of entitlements is usually larger than the total remaining resource.

The most intuitive rule for solving such problems is the proportional rule, in which each agent gets a part of the resource proportional to his entitlement. This rule is definitely coherent. However, it is not the only coherent rule: the Talmudic rule of the contested garment can be extended to a coherent division rule.

== Coherence in organ allocation ==
In most countries, the number of patients waiting for an organ transplantation is much larger than the number of available organs. Therefore, most countries choose who to allocate an organ to by some priority-ordering. Surprisingly, some priority orderings used in practice are not coherent. For example, one rule used by UNOS in the past was as follows:

- Each patient is assigned a personal score, based on some medical data.
- Each patient is assigned a bonus, which is 10 times the fraction of patients who waited less than him.
- The agents are prioritized by the sum of their score + bonus.

Suppose the personal scores of some four patients A, B, C, D are 16, 21, 20, 23. Suppose their waiting times are A > B > C > D. Accordingly, their bonuses are 10, 7.5, 5, 2.5. So their sums are 26, 28.5, 25, 25.5, and the priority order is B > A > D > C. Now, after B receives an organ, the personal scores of A, C, D remain the same, but the bonuses change to 10, 6.67, 3.33, so the sums are 26, 26.67, 26.33, and the priority order is C > D > A. This inverts the order between the three agents.

In order to have a coherent priority ordering, the priority should be determined only by personal traits. For example, the bonus can be computed by the number of months in line, rather than by the fraction of patients.

== See also ==
- Apportionment paradox
