= Rank-index method =

Class of apportionment methods

In apportionment theory, rank-index methods are a set of apportionment methods that generalize the divisor method. These have also been called Huntington methods, since they generalize an idea by Edward Vermilye Huntington.

== Input and output ==
Like all apportionment methods, the inputs of any rank-index method are:

- A positive integer $h$ representing the total number of items to allocate. It is also called the house size.
- A positive integer $n$ representing the number of agents to which items should be allocated. For example, these can be federal states or political parties.
- A vector of fractions $(t_1,\ldots,t_n)$ with $\sum_{i=1}^n t_i = 1$, representing entitlements - $t_i$ represents the entitlement of agent $i$, that is, the fraction of items to which $i$ is entitled (out of the total of $h$).

Its output is a vector of integers $a_1,\ldots,a_n$ with $\sum_{i=1}^n a_i = h$, called an apportionment of $h$, where $a_i$ is the number of items allocated to agent i.

== Iterative procedure ==
Every rank-index method is parametrized by a rank-index function $r(t,a)$, which is increasing in the entitlement $t$ and decreasing in the current allocation $a$. The apportionment is computed iteratively as follows:

- Initially, set $a_i$ to 0 for all parties.
- At each iteration, allocate one item to an agent for whom $r(t_i,a_i)$ is maximum (break ties arbitrarily).
- Stop after $h$ iterations.

Divisor methods are a special case of rank-index methods: a divisor method with divisor function $d(a)$ is equivalent to a rank-index method with rank-index function $r(t,a) = t/d(a)$.

== Min-max formulation ==
Every rank-index method can be defined using a min-max inequality: a is an allocation for the rank-index method with function r, if-and-only-if:

$\min_{i: a_i > 0} r(t_i, a_i-1) \geq \max_{i} r(t_i, a_i)$.

== Properties ==
Every rank-index method is house-monotone. This means that, when $h$ increases, the allocation of each agent weakly increases. This immediately follows from the iterative procedure.

Every rank-index method is uniform. This means that, we take some subset of the agents $1,\ldots,k$, and apply the same method to their combined allocation, then the result is exactly the vector $(a_1,\ldots,a_k)$. In other words: every part of a fair allocation is fair too. This immediately follows from the min-max inequality.

Moreover:

- Every apportionment method that is uniform, symmetric and balanced must be a rank-index method.
- Every apportionment method that is uniform, house-monotone and balanced must be a rank-index method.

== Quota-capped divisor methods ==
A quota-capped divisor method is an apportionment method where we begin by assigning every state its lower quota of seats. Then, we add seats one-by-one to the state with the highest votes-per-seat average, so long as adding an additional seat does not result in the state exceeding its upper quota. However, quota-capped divisor methods violate the participation criterion (also called population monotonicity)—it is possible for a party to lose a seat as a result of winning more votes.

Every quota-capped divisor method satisfies house monotonicity. Moreover, quota-capped divisor methods satisfy the quota rule.

However, quota-capped divisor methods violate the participation criterion (also called population monotonicity)—it is possible for a party to lose a seat as a result of winning more votes. This occurs when:

1. Party i gets more votes.
2. Because of the greater divisor, the upper quota of some other party j decreases. Therefore, party j is not eligible to a seat in the current iteration, and some third party receives the seat instead.
3. Then, at the next iteration, party j is again eligible to win a seat and it beats party i.

Moreover, quota-capped versions of other algorithms frequently violate the true quota in the presence of error (e.g. census miscounts). Jefferson's method frequently violates the true quota, even after being quota-capped, while Webster's method and Huntington-Hill perform well even without quota-caps.
