= Living document =

Document that is continuously updated

A living document, also known as an evergreen document or dynamic document, is a document that is continually edited and updated. An example of a living document is an article in Wikipedia, an online encyclopedia that permits anyone to freely edit its articles; this is in contrast to "dead" or "static" documents, such as an article in a single edition of the Encyclopædia Britannica.

A living document may or may not have a framework for updates, changes, or adjustments. This type of document without proper context can change away from its original purpose through multiple uncontrolled edits. This can encourage open collaboration within the network, but in some cases there can also be stagnation if no one takes on the initiative of updating the work. One reason why initiative is not taken to update the document could come from a sense of ambiguity.

A living document may evolve through successive updates, be expanded as needed, and serve a different purpose over time. Living documents are changed through revisions that may or may not reference previous iterative changes. The rate of document drift depends on the structure of the original document, or original intent of such document, or guidelines for modifying such document.

== In law ==
In legal philosophy, living document can take on a different meaning, e.g., when applied to living constitution, referring to the philosophy of updating the legal interpretation of the document as an activity separate from the amending, changing or updating of the document itself.

=== Canada ===
In Canadian law, this concept is called the "living tree doctrine" (French: théorie de l'arbre vivant). The 1929 case Edwards v. Canada (Attorney General), which decided upon the right of women to sit in the Canadian Senate, was the first to establish this principle. The case was decided by the Judicial Committee of the Privy Council, whereupon Viscount Sankey wrote of the ruling:

The British North America Act planted in Canada a living tree capable of growth and expansion within its natural limits. The object of the Act was to grant a Constitution to Canada. Like all written constitutions it has been subject to development through usage and convention...

Their Lordships do not conceive it to be the duty of this Board—it is certainly not their desire—to cut down the provisions of the Act by a narrow and technical construction, but rather to give it a large and liberal interpretation so that the Dominion to a great extent, but within certain fixed limits, may be mistress in her own house, as the provinces to a great extent, but within certain fixed limits, are mistresses in theirs.

From this approach was born what became known as the living tree doctrine which requires "large and liberal" interpretation, declaring a doctrine of constitutional interpretation that says that a constitution is organic and must be read in a broad and progressive manner so as to adapt it to the changing times.

The living tree principle was again expressed by the Supreme Court of Canada, in Re: Same-Sex Marriage (2004), when it held that Parliament (as opposed to provincial legislatures) had the power to define marriage as including same-sex unions. It rejected claims that the constitutionally enumerated federal authority in matters of "Marriage and Divorce" could not include same-sex marriage because marriage as conceived in 1867 was necessarily opposite-sex:

The "frozen concepts" reasoning runs contrary to one of the most fundamental principles of Canadian constitutional interpretation: that our Constitution is a living tree which, by way of progressive interpretation, accommodates and addresses the realities of modern life.

=== United States ===
In United States constitutional law, the Living Constitution view, also known as loose constructionism, changes the interpretation of the document over time. The opposing view, originalism, holds that the original intent or meaning of the writers of the Constitution should guide its interpretation.

== In business ==
In business, a living document may fall under corporate change management or be shared among a team. It may start as a draft that at some time graduates into general acceptance, or may originate as part of a formal documentation process. Regardless of the degree of formality, a living document needs rules or guidelines for its modification. Such guidelines allow—and should ideally encourage—the document's evolution over time. It is in this sense of growth that the document can be thought of as "living."

== In technology ==
In the modern context, a living document comprises information that may be utilized to start a new event, be self-executing, and participate in a broader automation procedure. In technology, living documents can be implemented using a wiki. Other common living document tools include Google Docs and Nextcloud Collabora.

Living documentation is a key concept in specification by example.
