= Egalitarian equivalence =

Criterion of fair division

Egalitarian equivalence (EE) is a criterion of fair division. In an egalitarian-equivalent division, there exists a certain "reference bundle" $Z$ such that each agent feels that his/her share is equivalent to $Z$.

The EE fairness principle is usually combined with Pareto efficiency. A PEEEA is an allocation that is both Pareto efficient and egalitarian-equivalent.

== Definition ==
A set of resources are divided among several agents such that every agent $i$ receives a bundle $X_i$. Every agent $i$ has a subjective preference relation $\succeq_i$ which is a total order over bundle. These preference relations induce an equivalence relation in the usual way: $X \sim_i Y$ iff $X \succeq_i Y \succeq_i X$.

An allocation is called egalitarian-equivalent if there exists a bundle $Z$ such that, for all $i$:

$$X_i \sim_i Z$$

An allocation is called PEEEA if it is both Pareto-efficient and egalitarian-equivalent.

== Motivation ==
The EE criterion was introduced by Elisha Pazner and David Schmeidler in 1978.

Previously, the main fairness criterion in economics has been envy-freeness (EF). EF has the merit that it is an ordinal criterion --- it can be defined based only on individual preference-relations; it does not need to compare utilities of different agents, or to assume that the agents' utility functions are normalized. However, EF might be incompatible with Pareto efficiency (PE). In particular, in a standard economy with production, there may be no allocation which is both PE and EF.

EE, like EF, is an ordinal criterion --- it can be defined based only on individual preference-relations. However, it is always compatible with PE --- a PEEEA (PE and EE Allocation) always exists, even in production economies. Pazner and Schmeidler informally describe a PEEEA as follows:

"Consider the case where there are two consumers and two commodities (but note that every step in the argument carries over to any number of agents and commodities...). Suppose that each consumer is given precisely half the total endowments. This egalitarian distribution will in general not be PE. Consider the ray in commodity space that goes from the origin through the vector of aggregate endowments. The egalitarian distribution is represented by each man being given the same bundle along this ray.

If the egalitarian distribution is not PE, then (by monotonicity and continuity of preferences) moving each man slightly up along the ray yields distributions of utilities that are still feasible, since the starting utility distribution is in the interior of the utility possibility set. In particular, if we simultaneously move each man up along the commodity ray in precisely the same manner, we eventually shall hit a utility distribution that lies on the utility possibility frontier. This means that there exists a Pareto-efficient allocation that is equivalent from the viewpoint of each consumer to the hypothetical (nonfeasible) distribution along the ray that would give to each consumer the same bundle (which, by being strictly greater than the egalitarian distribution of the aggregate endowments, is itself not feasible). This PE allocation is thus equivalent to the egalitarian distribution in the hypothetical (larger than the original) economy...

The resulting set of allocations is what we call the set of Pareto-efficient and egalitarian-equivalent allocations (PEEEA). It is a restriction of the Pareto set of the economy to those allocations having the specified equity property that their underlying utility levels distribution could have been generated by some egalitarian economy.".

== Relation to the maximin criterion ==
As a special case, assume that there is a finite number of homogeneous divisible goods. Let $W$ be a certain bundle. For every $r\in[0,1]$, let $rW$ be the bundle in which the amount of each good is $r$ times its amount in $W$.

Suppose the preference-relation of each agent $i$ is represented by a utility function $V_i$, which is calibrated such that: $V_i(rW) = r$. Then, a special case of an EE allocation is an allocation in which, for all $i$:

$$V_i(X_i) = r$$

In other words, all agents have the same calibrated utility. In this case, the Pareto-efficient EE allocation (PEEEA) coincides with the maximin allocation - the allocation that maximizes the minimum utility.

Note that the maximin principle depends on numeric utility. Therefore, it cannot be used directly with ordinal preference-relations. The EE principle is ordinal, and it suggests a particular way to calibrate the utilities so that they can be used with the maximin principle.

In the special case in which $W$ is the bundle of all resources (the aggregate endowment), an egalitarian-equivalent division is also called an equitable division.

Herve Moulin describes this special case of the EE rule as follows:

"The EE solution equalizes across agents the utilities measured along the "numeraire" of the commodity bundle to be divided. In other words, this solution gives to each participant an allocation that he or she views as equivalent (with his or her own preferences) to the same share of the pie, where the "pie" stands for the resources to be divided and a share is a homothetic reduction of the pie --- this is the same fraction of the total available amount of each commodity".

== Example ==
The following example is based on.

- There are three cities, A B and C.
- There is a road from A to B and a road from B to C.
- Each road can carry a total of 100 units of traffic.
- There are 100 agents: 40 need to pass traffic from A to B, 30 from B to C, and 30 from A to C.
- The utility of each agent equals the amount of traffic he is allowed to pass. So, if an agent gets x units of AB and y units of BC, his utility is x (if he is in the AB group), y (if he is in the BC group), or min(x,y) (if he is in the AC group).

The question is how to divide the 100 units of capacity in each road among the 100 agents? Here are some possible solutions.

- Suppose we give each agent the bundle $(x=1,y=1)$, i.e., one unit of each road (so his utility is 1). This division is egalitarian, but it is obviously not PE, since the AB agents and the BC agents can improve their welfare by trading their shares in the roads they do not need.
- Suppose we want to give each agent a utility of r, for some $r>1$. Then, we have to allocate $40r + 30r$ units of AB and $30r + 30r$ units of BC. We can allocate at most 100 units of each road; therefore $r \leq 100/70 = 30/21 \approx 1.43$. The division where the AB agents get 30/21 units of AB, the BC agents get 30/21 units of BC, and the AC agents get 30/21 units of both roads, is egalitarian equivalent, since each agent is indifferent between his share and the constant bundle $(x=30/21,y=30/21)$. It is also an equitable division, since the normalized utility of each agent is 30/21 However, this division is still not PE: it allocates 100 units of AB but only 600/7 units of BC.
- We can make the above division PE by giving the remaining units of BC to the BC agents; this improves their utility to $40/21 \approx 1.90$ without harming the other agents. In the resulting allocation, each agent is indifferent between his share and the constant bundle $(x=30/21,y=40/21)$. Therefore, this division too is egalitarian-equivalent. Now all capacities are allocated and the division is PE; therefore this is the PEEEA. Note that the resulting allocation is leximin-optimal - it maximizes the utility of the poorest agents, and subject to that, it maximizes the utility of the other agents.

=== Variant ===
Consider now the following variant on the above example. The utilities of the AB and BC agents are as above, but the utility of the AC agents when getting x units of AB and y units of BC is now (x+y)/2. Note that it is normalized such that their utility from having a unit of each resource is 1.

- Suppose we want to give each agent a utility of r, for some $r>1$. Then we have to allocate $40r + 30x$ units of AB and $30r + 30y$ units of BC, where $x+y=2 r$. Since there are 100 units of each good, we have $r \leq 200/130 = 60/39 \approx 1.54$. The division where the AB agents get 60/39 units of AB, the BC agents get 60/39 units of BC, and the AC agents get 50/39 of AB plus 70/39 of BC, is EE, since each agent is indifferent between his share and the constant bundle $(x=60/39,y=60/39)$. It is also equitable, since the utility of all agents is 60/39. It is also PE, hence it is a PEEEA. Unfortunately, it is not EF since the BC agents envy the AC agents. Moreover, the bundle of an AC agent dominates the bundle of a BC agent: they get more of every resource, which seems quite unfair.
- Instead of taking a reference bundle with equal amounts of each resource (r,r), we can take a reference bundle with different amounts (r,s). Then we have to allocate $40r + 30x$ units of AB and $30s + 30y$ units of BC, where $x+y=r+s$. Since there are 100 units of each good, we have $70 r+60 s \leq 200$. Combining this with an envy-freeness condition gives $r=100/70=30/21\approx 1.43, s=100/60=35/21\approx 1.67$. The division where the AB agents get 30/21 units of AB, the BC agents get 35/21 units of BC, and the AC agents get 30/21 units of AB plus 35/21 of BC, is EE, since each agent is indifferent between his share and the constant bundle $(x=30/21,y=35/21)$. It is also PE, so it is PEEEA. It is also EF, so it is also PEEFA. However, it is not equitable: the relative utility of the AB agents is $30/21\approx 1.43$, of the BC agents - $35/21\approx 1.67$, and of the AC agents - $32.5/21\approx 1.54$.

To summarize: in this example, a divider who believes in the importance of egalitarian-equivalence must choose between equitability and envy-freeness.

== EE and EF ==
When there are two agents, the set of PEEE allocations contains the set of PEEF allocations. The advantage of PEEEA is that they exist even when there are no PEEFA.

However, with three or more agents, the set of PE allocations that are both EE and EF might be empty. This is the case both in exchange economies with homogeneous divisible resources and in economies with indivisibilities.

== Properties ==
In the special case in which the reference bundle contains a constant fraction of each good, the PEEEA rule has some more desirable properties:

- proportionality: each agent believes that his share is at least as good as the bundle that contains $1/n$ of each resource.
- Population monotonicity: when an agent leaves the scene and the resources are re-divided according to the same rule, each of the remaining agents is weakly better-off.

However, it is lacking some other desirable properties:

- envy-freeness: even though all agents believe that their bundle is equivalent to the same reference-bundle, they might still believe that another bundle is worth more than theirs.
- resource monotonicity: when more resources are available for allocation and the resources are re-divided according to the same rule, some agents might be worse-off.

In some settings, the PEEEA rule is equivalent to the Kalai-Smorodinsky bargaining solution.

== See also ==
- Egalitarian rule - a general social choice rule.
- Egalitarian cake-cutting and Equitable cake-cutting - similar criteria in the context of dividing a heterogeneous resource.
