= Vote-ratio monotonicity =

Property of apportionment methods

Vote-ratio, weight-ratio, or population-ratio monotonicity is a property of some apportionment methods. It says that if the entitlement for $A$ grows at a faster rate than $B$ (i.e. $A$ grows proportionally more than $B$), $A$ should not lose a seat to $B$. More formally, if the ratio of votes or populations $A / B$ increases, then $A$ should not lose a seat while $B$ gains a seat. An apportionment method violating this rule may encounter population paradoxes.

A particularly severe variant, where voting for a party causes it to lose seats, is called a no-show paradox. The largest remainders method exhibits both population and no-show paradoxes.

== Population-pair monotonicity ==
Pairwise monotonicity says that if the ratio between the entitlements of two states $i, j$ increases, then state $j$ should not gain seats at the expense of state $i$. In other words, a shrinking state should not "steal" a seat from a growing state.

Some earlier apportionment rules, such as Hamilton's method, do not satisfy VRM, and thus exhibit the population paradox. For example, after the 1900 census, Virginia lost a seat to Maine, even though Virginia's population was growing more rapidly.

== Strong monotonicity ==
A stronger variant of population monotonicity, called strong monotonicity requires that, if a state's entitlement (share of the population) increases, then its apportionment should not decrease, regardless of what happens to any other state's entitlement. This variant is extremely strong, however: whenever there are at least 3 states, and the house size is not exactly equal to the number of states, no apportionment method is strongly monotone for a fixed house size. Strong monotonicity failures in divisor methods happen when one state's entitlement increases, causing it to "steal" a seat from another state whose entitlement is unchanged.

However, it is worth noting that the traditional form of the divisor method, which involves using a fixed divisor and allowing the house size to vary, satisfies strong monotonicity in this sense.

== Relation to other properties ==
Balinski and Young proved that an apportionment method is VRM if-and-only-if it is a divisor method.

Palomares, Pukelsheim and Ramirez proved that very apportionment rule that is anonymous, balanced, concordant, homogenous, and coherent is vote-ratio monotone.

Vote-ratio monotonicity implies that, if population moves from state $i$ to state $j$ while the populations of other states do not change, then both $a_i' \geq a_i$ and $a_j' \leq a_j$ must hold.

== See also ==
- Apportionment paradox
- Seats-to-votes ratio
