= Peter Wakker =

Dutch economist (born 1956)

- Born: March 16, 1956 (age 70)

Academic background
- Education: Nijmegen University; Tilburg University
- Doctoral advisor: Pieter Ruys; Stef Tijs; David Schmeidler
- Influences: Bruno de Finetti, Daniel Kahneman, Amos Tversky, Peter C. Fishburn

Academic work
- Discipline: Behavioral economics, Decision theory
- Awards: INFORMS Frank P. Ramsey Medal
- Website: Information at IDEAS / RePEc

Peter Paul Wakker (/ˈvɑːkər/; born March 16, 1956) is a Dutch economist. He is a professor of Behavioral Economics at the Erasmus School of Economics, in Rotterdam, and a research fellow at the Tinbergen Institute. He is considered one of the most important researchers in the fields of behavioral economics and decision theory.

Wakker's research within behavioral economics is mostly related to understanding our attitudes towards uncertainty, risk and ambiguity. He has also done research in axiomatic decision theory, in particular related to the utility representation of preferences. In both of those fields, Wakker has done both theoretical and experimental work.

== Biography ==
=== Life and education ===
Peter P. Wakker was born in Herwen en Aerdt on March 16, 1956. His father was a border custom's agent. Wakker studied Mathematics and Physics at the University of Nijmegen, from where he got a Master's degree in Mathematics, with a specialization in probability theory and statistics. During that time, he was very influenced by de Finetti and Bayesian statistics.

Wakker earned his PhD in 1986 from Tilburg University's Center for Economic Research (CentER), under the supervision of Pieter Ruys and Stef Tijs. During his PhD, he did some work at the Tel Aviv University under the supervision of David Schmeidler.

=== Career ===
From 1992 to 2000, Wakker was a professor at the Medical Decision Making Unit of Leiden University's Medical Center. He was also a professor at the universities of Maastricht, Tilburg, and Amsterdam. Since 2005, he has been a professor at Erasmus University Rotterdam, initially at the Econometric Institute and since 2010 at the Erasmus School of Economics.

== Publications ==
=== Books ===
- Wakker, Peter (1988). Additive Representations of Preferences: A New Foundation of Decision Analysis. Springer. ISBN 978-9048140367.
- Wakker, Peter (2010). Prospect Theory: For Risk and Ambiguity. Cambridge University Press. ISBN 978-0521748681.

=== Selected papers ===
- Wakker, Peter; Tversky, Amos (1993). "An axiomatization of cumulative prospect theory" (PDF). Journal of Risk and Uncertainty. 7 (7): 147–176. doi:10.1007/BF01065812.
- Tversky, Amos; Waker, Peter (1995). "Risk Attitudes and Decision Weights" (PDF). Econometrica. 63 (6): 1255–1280. doi:10.2307/2171769.
- Kahneman, Daniel; Waker, Peter; Sarin, Rakesh (1997). "Back to Bentham? Explorations of experienced utility" (PDF). The Quarterly Journal of Economics. 111 (2): 375–406. doi:10.2307/2171769.
- Wakker, Peter P. (2001). "Testing and Characterizing Properties of Nonadditive Measures Through Violations of the Sure-Thing Principle" (PDF). Econometrica. 69 (4): 1039–1059. doi:10.1111/1468-0262.00229.
- Abdellaoui, Mohammed; Wakker, Peter P. (2005). "The Likelihood Method for Decision under Uncertainty" (PDF). Theory and Decision. 58: 3–76. doi:10.1007/s11238-005-8320-4.
- Köbberling, Veronika; Wakker, Peter P. (2005). "An index of loss aversion" (PDF). Journal of Economic Theory. 122: 119–131. doi:10.1016/j.jet.2004.03.009.
- Abdellaoui, Mohammed; Baillon, Aurélien; Placido, Laetitia; Wakker, Peter P. (2011). "The Rich Domain of Uncertainty: Source Functions and Their Experimental Implementation" (PDF). American Economic Review. 101 (2): 695–723. doi:10.1257/aer.101.2.695.
