= House monotonicity =

Method of allocating seats in a parliament

House monotonicity (also called house-size monotonicity) is a property of apportionment methods. These are methods for allocating seats in a parliament among federal states (or among political parties). The property says that, if the number of seats in the "house" (the parliament) increases, and the method is re-activated, then no state (or party) should have fewer seats than it previously had. A method that fails to satisfy house-monotonicity is said to have the Alabama paradox.

In the context of committee elections, house monotonicity is often called committee monotonicity. It says that, if the size of the committee increases, then all the candidate that were previously elected, are still elected.

House monotonicity is the special case of resource monotonicity for the setting in which the resource consists of identical discrete items (the seats).

== Methods violating house-monotonicity ==
An example of a method violating house-monotonicity is the largest remainder method (= Hamilton's method). Consider the following instance with three states:

		10 seats house		11 seats house	
State	Population	Fair share	Seats	Fair share	Seats
A	6	4.286	4	4.714	5
B	6	4.286	4	4.714	5
C	2	1.429	2	1.571	1

When one seat is added to the house, the share of state C decreases from 2 to 1.

This occurs because increasing the number of seats increases the fair share faster for the large states than for the small states. In particular, large A and B had their fair share increase faster than small C. Therefore, the fractional parts for A and B increased faster than those for C. In fact, they overtook C's fraction, causing C to lose its seat, since the method examines which states have the largest remaining fraction.

This violation is known as the Alabama paradox due to the history of its discovery. After the 1880 census, C. W. Seaton, chief clerk of the United States Census Bureau, computed apportionments for all House sizes between 275 and 350, and discovered that Alabama would get eight seats with a House size of 299 but only seven with a House size of 300.

== Methods satisfying house-monotonicity ==
=== Methods for apportionment ===
All the highest-averages methods (= divisor methods) satisfy house monotonicity. This is easy to see when considering the implementation of divisor methods as picking sequences: when a seat is added, the only change is that the picking sequence is extended with one additional pick. Therefore, all states keep their previously picked seats. Similarly, rank-index methods, which are generalizations of divisor methods, satisfy house-monotonicity.

Moreover, capped divisor methods, which are variants of divisor methods in which a state never gets more seats than its upper quota, also satisfy house-monotonicity. An example is the Balinsky-Young quota method.

Every house-monotone method can be defined as a recursive function of the house size h. Formally, an apportionment method $M(\mathbf{t},h)$ is house-monotone and satisfies both quotas if-and-only-if it is constructed recursively as follows (see mathematics of apportionment for the definitions and notation):

- $M(\mathbf{t},0) = 0$;
- If $M(\mathbf{t},h) = \mathbf{a}$, then $M(\mathbf{t},h+1)$ is found by giving $a_i+1$ seats to some single state $i\in U(\mathbf{t},\mathbf{a})\cap L(\mathbf{t},\mathbf{a})$, where:
  - $U(\mathbf{t},\mathbf{a})$ is the set of states that can get an additional seat without violating their upper quota for the new house size;
  - $L(\mathbf{t},\mathbf{a})$ is the set of states that might receive less than their lower quota for some future house size.

Every coherent apportionment method is house-monotone.

=== Methods for multiwinner voting ===
The sequential Phragmen's voting rules, both for approval ballots and for ranked ballots, are committee-monotone. The same is true for Thiele's addition method and Thiele's elimination method. However, Thiele's optimization method is not committee-monotone.

== See also ==
- Resource monotonicity - a generalization of house-monotonicity to possibly different items.
- Monotonicity criterion - a different criterion, used for ranked voting systems.
