= Itzhak Gilboa =

Israeli economist

- יצחק גלבוע
- Born: February 3, 1963 (age 63); Tel Aviv, Israel
- Citizenship: Israel

Academic background
- Education: Tel Aviv University
- Doctoral advisor: David Schmeidler

Academic work
- Institutions: Northwestern University; Tel Aviv University; HEC Paris
- Doctoral students: Akihiko Matsui; Marzena Rostek
- Website: Information at IDEAS / RePEc

Itzhak Gilboa (Hebrew: יצחק גלבוע; born February 3, 1963, in Tel Aviv) is an Israeli economist with contributions in decision theory. His work include the theory of Maxmin Expected Utility with David Schmeidler. This theory explains individual attitudes towards ambiguity that are consistent with the Ellsberg paradox. He currently holds professorship positions at HEC Paris and Reichman University.

== Education and career ==
Gilboa was born in Tel Aviv. After obtaining his BA in Mathematics and Economics from Tel Aviv University, he earned his Ph.D. in 1987 under the supervision of David Schmeidler. Gilboa joined Kellogg School of Management at Northwestern University after graduation and was promoted to a full professorship in 1992. From 1992 to 1997, he was the Frederic E. Nemmers Distinguished Professor of Decision Sciences at Northwestern University. Between 1997 and 1999, he was a part-time professor of economics as Boston University.

Gilboa joined Tel Aviv University in 1997 as a professor of economics until 2023, when he moved to Reichman University. He holds separate appointment in the Department of Economics and Decision Sciences at HEC Paris since 2008.

== Honors and awards ==
Gilboa was elected a Fellow of the Econometric Society in 2000. From 2001 to 2009, Gilboa was a Fellow of the Cowles Foundation at Yale University. In 2013, he became a Fellow of the Society for the Advancement of Economic Theory. In 2025, he became a member of the Academia Europaea.

== Books ==
- I. Gilboa, D. Schmeidler, A Theory of Case-Based Decisions Cambridge : Cambridge University Press, 2001. ISBN 9780511012952
  - Translated into Japanese as 決め方の科学 : 事例ベース意思決定理論 / Kimekata no kagaku : jirei bēsu ishi kettei riron ISBN 9784326502592
- N. Dimitri, M. Basili, and I. Gilboa, eds.. Cognitive Processes and Economic Behaviour. London: Routledge, 2003. ISBN 9780415320054
- Ỉ. Gilboa Theory of decision under uncertainty Cambridge; New York : Cambridge University Press, 2009 ISBN 9780521517324
- I. Gilboa, Rational Choice. Cambridge, Mass. : MIT Press, 2010. ISBN 9780262014007
- I. Gilboa. Making Better Decisions: Decision Theory in Practice. Chichester, West Sussex: Wiley-Blackwell, 2011. ISBN 9781444336511.
- I. Gilboa, L. Samuelson, and D. Schmeidler. Analogies and Theories: Formal Models of Reasoning (Lipsey Lectures) Oxford : Oxford University Press, 2015. ISBN 9780198738022
