= Knightian uncertainty =

Lack of quantifiable knowledge in economics

In economics, Knightian uncertainty is a lack of any quantifiable knowledge about some possible occurrence, as opposed to the presence of quantifiable risk (e.g., that in statistical noise or a parameter's confidence interval). The concept acknowledges some fundamental degree of ignorance, a limit to knowledge, and an essential unpredictability of future events.

Knightian uncertainty is named after University of Chicago economist Frank Knight who distinguished risk and uncertainty in his 1921 work Risk, Uncertainty, and Profit:

"Uncertainty must be taken in a sense radically distinct from the familiar notion of Risk, from which it has never been properly separated.... The essential fact is that 'risk' means in some cases a quantity susceptible of measurement, while at other times it is something distinctly not of this character; and there are far-reaching and crucial differences in the bearings of the phenomena depending on which of the two is really present and operating.... It will appear that a measurable uncertainty, or 'risk' proper, as we shall use the term, is so far different from an unmeasurable one that it is not in effect an uncertainty at all".

In this matter Knight's own views were widely shared by key economists in the 1920s and 1930s who played a key role distinguishing the effects of risk from uncertainty. They were particularly concerned with the different impact on human behavior as economic agents. Entrepreneurs invest for quantifiable risk and return; savers may mistrust potential future inflation.

Whilst Frank Knight's seminal book elaborated the problem, his focus was on how uncertainty generates imperfect market structures and explains actual profits. Work on estimating and mitigating uncertainty was continued by G. L. S. Shackle who later followed up with Potential Surprise Theory. However, the concept is largely informal and there is no single best formal system of probability and belief to represent Knightian uncertainty. Economists and management scientists continue to look at practical methodologies for decision under different types of uncertainty.

== Related concepts ==
=== Common cause and special cause ===
The difference between predictable variation and unpredictable variation is one of the fundamental issues in the philosophy of probability, and different probability interpretations treat predictable and unpredictable variation differently. The debate about the distinction has a long history.

Whereas known unknowns and unknown unknowns are both states of unquantifiable or Knightian uncertainty, known knowns – e.g. the probability of rolling a six with a die – is not, as the risk can be measured and probabilities estimated. (Note: Knight (1964) distinguished between cases where risk prevails, so that the probabilities of events are known, and cases where uncertainty prevails and probabilities are unknown. Knight does not state whether the set of possible events is known under uncertainty, although he implies that the events are known. In a complex adaptive system (consult Section III in the source) the event space can change frequently and in unknowable ways, making the set of possible events unknowable, as well as the probabilities of even previously known events. In the taxonomy, known unknowns correspond to cases where the event space is known but probabilities are not; unknown unknowns, to cases where the event space is unknown and, by implication, probabilities also are unknown.)

=== Ellsberg paradox ===
The Ellsberg paradox is based on the difference between these two types of imperfect knowledge, and the problems it poses for utility theory – one is faced with an urn that contains 30 red balls and 60 balls that are either all yellow or all black, and one then draws a ball from the urn. This poses both uncertainty – whether the non-red balls are all yellow or all black – and probability – whether the ball is red or non-red, which is 1/3 vs. 2/3. Expressed preferences in choices faced with this situation reveal that people do not treat these types of imperfect knowledge the same. This difference in treatment is also termed "ambiguity aversion".

=== Black swan events ===
A black swan event, as defined by Nassim Nicholas Taleb, is an important and inherently unpredictable event that, once occurred, is interpreted with the benefit of hindsight. (Note: Taleb (2010, p, xxii) describes this as the human tendency to create narratives ex post to rationalise the event and make it seem to have been predictable.) Another position of the black swan theory is that appropriate preparation for these events is frequently hindered by the pretense of knowledge of all the risks; in other words, Knightian uncertainty is presumed to not exist in day-to-day affairs, often with disastrous consequences. Taleb asserts that Knightian risk does not exist in the real world, and instead finds gradations of computable risk.

=== Effectuation ===
Saras Sarasvathy has proposed effectuation as a way to manage Knightian Uncertainty, based on her study of serial entrepreneurs, and summarised her findings in five principles:

- The Bird in Hand Principle: Focusing on resources at hand.
- The Focus on the Downside Principle: Focusing on what can be lost.
- The Crazy Quilt Principle: Building a network of diverse partnerships.
- The Lemonade Principle: Treating changes in external factors as opportunities to be exploited. "When life gives you lemons, make lemonade."
- The Pilot in the Plane Principle: Focusing on factors that are within one's control, rather than uncontrollable factors.

Others have critiqued this approach as failing to address immitigable uncertainty in any specific, novel, logically consistent way (given making lemonade and bricolage are well-known ideas).

== See also ==
- Information asymmetry
- Perfect information
- Emanuel Derman § Models.Behaving.Badly
- There are known knowns
- Uninformative prior
