= David Schmeidler =

Israeli mathematician (1939–2022)

- דוד שמידלר
- Born: 1939; Kraków, Poland
- Died: 17 March 2022 (aged 82–83)

Academic background
- Education: Hebrew University of Jerusalem
- Thesis: משחקים עם רצף של שחקנים (Games with a continuum of players) (1969)
- Doctoral advisor: Robert Aumann

Academic work
- Discipline: Mathematics; Economics
- Institutions: Tel Aviv University; Ohio State University
- Doctoral students: Itzhak Gilboa
- Notable students: Peter Wakker
- Website: Information at IDEAS / RePEc

David Schmeidler (Hebrew: דוד שמידלר; 1939 – 17 March 2022) was an Israeli mathematician and economic theorist. He was a Professor Emeritus at Tel Aviv University and the Ohio State University.

== Biography ==
David Schmeidler was born in 1939 in Kraków, Poland. He spent the war years in Russia and moved back to Poland at the end of the war and to Israel in 1949. From 1960 to 1969 he studied mathematics at the Hebrew University of Jerusalem (BSc, MSc, and PhD), the advanced degrees under the supervision of Robert Aumann. He visited the Catholic University of Louvain and University of California at Berkeley before joining Tel-Aviv University in 1971, holding professorships in statistics, economics, and management. He held a part-time position as professor of economics at the Ohio State University since 1987. Schmeidler died on 17 March 2022.

== Main contributions ==
Schmeidler's early contributions were in game theory and general equilibrium theory. He suggested a new approach to solving cooperative games – the nucleolus – based on equity as well as feasibility considerations. This concept, originating from Schmeidler's PhD dissertation, was used to resolve a 2000 years old problem. Robert Aumann and Michael Maschler, in a paper published in 1985, showed that a conundrum from the Babylonian Talmud, which defied scholars’ attempts at comprehension over two millennia, was naturally resolved when applying the concept of the nucleolus.

Schmeidler also pioneered the study of non-atomic strategic games, in which each player has negligible impact on the play of the game, as well as the related concept of “congestion games”, where a player's payoff only depends on the distribution of the other players’ strategic choices (and not on individual choices).

Schmeidler has made many other contributions, ranging from conceptual issues in implementation theory, to mathematical results in measure theory. But his most influential contribution is probably in decision theory. Schmeidler was the first to propose a general-purpose, axiomatically-based decision theoretic model that deviated from the Bayesian dictum, according to which any uncertainty can and should be quantified by probabilities. He suggested and axiomatized Choquet Expected Utility, according to which uncertainty is modeled by a capacity (not-necessarily-additive set function) and expectation is computed by the Choquet integral.

While this approach can be used to explain commonly observed behavior in Ellsberg's experiments, Schmeidler's motivation was not to explain psychological findings. Rather, along the lines attributed to Frank Knight and John Maynard Keynes, the argument is normative, suggesting that it is not necessarily more rational to be Bayesian than not. While in the experiments, drawing balls from urns, one may adopt a probabilistic belief, in real life one often couldn't find a natural candidate for one's beliefs.

With Elisha Pazner, he introduced the notion of egalitarian equivalence - a criterion for fair division of homogeneous resources, that has advantages over the previously studied criterion of envy-freeness.

With his student, Itzhak Gilboa, David Schmeidler also developed the theory maxmin expected utility and case-based decision theory. He has also served as the advisor of Peter Wakker, Shiri Alon, and Xiangyu Qu.

== Selected works ==
- 1969: "The nucleolus of a characteristic function game", SIAM Journal on Applied Mathematics 17: 1163–1170.
- 1973: "Equilibrium points of non-atomic games", Journal of Statistical Physics 7: 295–301.
- 1986: "Integral representation without additivity", Proceedings of the American Mathematical Society 97: 255–261.
- 1989: "Subjective probability and expected utility without additivity", Econometrica 57: 571–587.
- 1989: (with Itzhak Gilboa) "Maximin expected utility with a non-unique prior", Journal of Mathematical Economics 18: 141–153.
- 1995: (with Itzhak Gilboa) "Case-based decision theory", Quarterly Journal of Economics 110: 605–639.
- 2001: (with Itzhak Gilboa) A Theory of Case-Based Decisions, Cambridge University Press
- 2015: (with Itzhak Gilboa & Larry Samuelson) Analogies and Theories: Formal Models of Reasoning, Oxford University Press ISBN 978-0-19-873802-2 MR 3362708

== Honors ==
David Schmeidler was a Fellow of the Econometric Society, Honorary Foreign Member of the American Academy of Arts and Sciences, and a Member of the Israeli Academy of Sciences and Humanities. He served as the President of the Game Theory Society (2014–2016).
