= Marzena Rostek =

Polish-American economist

Marzena Joanna Rostek is a Polish-American professor of economics who holds the Juli Plant Grainger Distinguished Chair at the University of Wisconsin–Madison. Her research interests include microeconomics, market design, and finance.

== Education and career ==
Rostek studied economics as an undergraduate at the University of Warsaw in Poland, graduating in 1999. She went on to earn a master's degree (M.Sc.) at KU Leuven in Belgium in 2000, a second master's degree (M.Phil.) at the University of Amsterdam in The Netherlands in 2001, and third and fourth master's degrees (M.A. and M.Phil.) at Yale University in 2003 and 2004. She completed her Ph.D. at Yale in 2006. Her doctoral dissertation, Reasoning in Strategic and Non-Strategic Interactions, was jointly supervised by Ben Polak and Itzhak Gilboa.

After postdoctoral research at the University of Oxford, she joined the University of Wisconsin–Madison as an assistant professor in 2006. She was promoted to associate professor in 2012 and to full professor in 2015. From 2016 to 2019 she was Lowell and Leila Robinson Professor of Economics, and in 2019 she was given the Juli Plant Grainger Distinguished Chair of Economics.

== Recognition ==
Rostek was elected as a Fellow of the Econometric Society in 2022.
