= Population monotonicity =

Principle of allocation

Population monotonicity (PM) is a principle of consistency in allocation problems. It says that, when the set of agents participating in the allocation changes, the utility of all agents should change in the same direction. For example, if the resource is good, and an agent leaves, then all remaining agents should receive at least as much utility as in the original allocation.

The term "population monotonicity" is used in an unrelated meaning in the context of apportionment of seats in the congress among states. There, the property relates to the population of an individual state, which determines the state's entitlement. A population-increase means that a state is entitled to more seats. This different property is described in the page state-population monotonicity.

== In fair cake cutting ==
In the fair cake-cutting problem, classic allocation rules such as divide and choose are not PM. Several rules are known to be PM:

- When the pieces may be disconnected, any function that maximizes a concave welfare function (a monotonically-increasing function of the utilities) is PM. This holds whether the welfare function operates on the absolute utilities or on the relative utilities. In particular, the Nash-optimal rule, absolute-leximin and relative-leximin rules, absolute-utilitarian and relative utilitarian rules are all PM. It is an open question whether concavity of the welfare function is necessary for PM.
- When the pieces must be connected, no Pareto-optimal proportional division rule is PM. The absolute-equitable rule and relative-equitable rules are weakly Pareto-optimal and PM.

== In fair house allocation ==
In the house allocation problem, a rule is PM and strategyproof and Pareto-efficient, if-and-only-if it assigns the houses iteratively, where at each iteration, at most two agents trade houses from their initial endowments.

== In fair item allocation ==
In the fair item allocation problem, the Nash-optimal rule is no longer PM. In contrast, round-robin item allocation is PM. Moreover, round-robin can be adapted to yield picking sequences appropriate for agents with different entitlements. Picking-sequences based on divisor methods are PM too. However, a picking-sequence based on the quota method is not PM.

== See also ==
- Resource monotonicity
- PM of the nucleolus in public good problems.
- PM in newsvendor games.
- PM in economies with one indivisible good.
