= Ambiguity aversion =

Preference of known risks to unknown risks

In decision theory and economics, ambiguity aversion (also known as uncertainty aversion) is a preference for known risks over unknown risks. An ambiguity-averse individual would rather choose an alternative where the probability distribution of the outcomes is known over one where the probabilities are unknown. This behavior was first introduced through the Ellsberg paradox (people prefer to bet on the outcome of an urn with 50 red and 50 black balls rather than to bet on one with 100 total balls but for which the number of black or red balls is unknown).

There are two categories of imperfectly predictable events between which choices must be made: risky and ambiguous events (also known as Knightian uncertainty). Risky events have a known probability distribution over outcomes while in ambiguous events the probability distribution is not known. The reaction is behavioral and still being formalized. Ambiguity aversion can be used to explain incomplete contracts, volatility in stock markets, and selective abstention in elections (Ghirardato & Marinacci, 2001).

The concept is expressed in the English proverb: "Better the devil you know than the devil you don't."

== Difference from risk aversion ==
The distinction between ambiguity aversion and risk aversion is important but subtle. Risk aversion comes from a situation where a probability can be assigned to each possible outcome of a situation and it is defined by the preference between a risky alternative and its expected value. Ambiguity aversion applies to a situation when the probabilities of outcomes are unknown (Epstein 1999) and it is defined through the preference between risky and ambiguous alternatives, after controlling for preferences over risk.

Using the traditional two-urn Ellsberg choice, urn A contains 50 red balls and 50 blue balls while urn B contains 100 total balls (either red or blue) but the number of each is unknown. An individual who prefers a certain payoff strictly smaller than $10 over a bet that pays $20 if the color of a ball drawn from urn A is guessed correctly and $0 otherwise is said to be risk averse but nothing can be said about her preferences over ambiguity. On the other hand, an individual who strictly prefers that same bet if the ball is drawn from urn A over the case where the ball is drawn from urn B is said to be ambiguity averse but not necessarily risk averse.

A real world consequence of increased ambiguity aversion is the increased demand for insurance because the general public are averse to the unknown events that will affect their lives and property (Alary, Treich, and Gollier 2010).

== Causes ==
Unlike risk aversion, which is primarily attributed to decreasing marginal utility, there is no widely accepted main cause for ambiguity aversion. The many possible explanations include different choice mechanisms, behavioral biases and differential treatment of compound lotteries; this in turn explains the lack of a widespread measure of ambiguity aversion.

=== Maxmin expected utility ===
In their 1989 paper, Gilboa and Schmeidler propose an axiomatic representation of preferences that rationalizes ambiguity aversion. An individual that behaves according to these axioms would act as if having multiple prior subjective probability distributions over the set of outcomes and chooses the alternative that maximizes the minimum expected utility over these distributions. In the Ellsberg example, if an individual has a set of subjective prior probabilities of a ball drawn from urn B being red ranging between, for example, 0.4 and 0.6, and applies a maxmin choice rule, she will strictly prefer a bet on urn A over a bet on urn B since the expected utility she assigns to urn A (based on an assumed 50% probability of the predicted color) is greater than the one she assigns to urn B (based on the worst-case 40% probability of the predicted color).

=== Choquet expected utility ===
David Schmeidler also developed the Choquet expected utility model. Its axiomatization allows for non-additive probabilities and the expected utility of an act is defined using a Choquet integral. This representation also rationalizes ambiguity aversion and has the maxmin expected utility as a particular case.

=== Compound lotteries ===
In Halevy (2007) the experimental results show that ambiguity aversion is related to violations of the Reduction of Compound Lotteries axiom (ROCL). This suggests that the effects attributed to ambiguity aversion may be partially explained by an inability to reduce compound lotteries to their corresponding simple lotteries or some behavioral violation of this axiom.

== Gender difference ==
Men are less risk-averse than women. One potential explanation for gender differences is that risk and ambiguity are related to cognitive and noncognitive traits on which men and women differ. Women initially respond to ambiguity much more favorably than men, but as ambiguity increases, men and women show similar marginal valuations of ambiguity. Psychological traits are strongly associated with risk but not to ambiguity. Adjusting for psychological traits explains why a gender difference exists within risk aversion and why these differences are not a part of ambiguity aversion. Since psychological measures are related to risk but not to ambiguity, risk aversion and ambiguity aversion are distinct traits because they depend on different variables.

== Experiments testing ambiguity in games ==
Battle of the Sexes Game with Ambiguity
Player 2 Player 1	Left	Middle	Right
Top	0 0	100 300	x 50
Bottom	300 100	0 0	x 55

Kelsey and le Roux (2015) report an experimental test of the influence of ambiguity on behaviour in a Battle of Sexes game which has an added safe strategy, R, available for Player 2 (see Table). The paper studies the behaviour of subjects in the presence of ambiguity and attempts to determine whether subjects playing the Battle of Sexes game prefer to choose an ambiguity safe option.

The value of x, which is the safe option available to Player 2, varies in the range 60-260. For some values of x, the safe strategy (option R) is dominated by a mixed strategy of L and M, and thus would not be played in a Nash equilibrium. For some higher values of x the game is dominance solvable. The effect of ambiguity-aversion is to make R (the ambiguity-safe option) attractive for Player 2. R is never chosen in Nash equilibrium for the parameter values considered. However it may be chosen when there is ambiguity. Moreover, for some values of x, the games are dominance solvable and R is not part of the equilibrium strategy.

During the experiment, the Battle of Sexes games were alternated with decision problems based on the 3-ball Ellsberg urn. In these rounds, subjects were presented with an urn containing 90 balls, of which 30 were Red, and the remainder an unknown proportion of Blue or Yellow, and asked to pick a colour to bet on. The payoff attached to Red was varied in order to obtain an ambiguity threshold. Alternating experiments on urns and games had the dual aim of erasing the short term memory of subjects, and providing an independent measure of subjects' ambiguity-attitudes.

It was found that R is chosen quite frequently by subjects. While the Row Player randomises 50:50 between her strategies, the Column Player shows a marked preference for avoiding ambiguity and choosing his ambiguity-safe strategy. Thus, the results provide evidence that ambiguity influences behaviour in the games.

One surprising feature of the results was that the links between choices in the single person decision and those in the games was not strong. Subjects appeared to perceive a greater level of ambiguity in a two-person coordination game, than a single person decision problem. More generally the results suggested that perceptions of ambiguity and even attitudes to ambiguity depend on context. Hence it may not be possible to measure ambiguity-attitude in one context and use it to predict behaviour in another.

== Ambiguity and learning ==
Given the salience of ambiguity in economic and financial research, it is natural to wonder about its relation with learning and its persistence over time. The long-run persistence of ambiguity clearly depends on the way the inter-temporal ambiguity is modeled. If the decision-maker incorporate new information according to a natural generalization of Bayes' rule entailing a set of priors (rather than a unique prior) on a given prior support; then Massari-Newton (2020) and Massari-Marinacci (2019) show that long-run ambiguity is not a possible outcome of the multiple prior-learning models with convex prior support (i.e., positive Lebegue measure) and provide sufficient conditions for ambiguity to fade away when the prior support is not convex, respectively.

== See also ==
- Ambiguity effect
- Ambiguity tolerance
- Choquet expected utility
- David Schmeidler
- Knightian uncertainty
- Precautionary principle
- Simplicity
- Uncertainty
- Uncertainty avoidance
