= Ambiguity effect =

Cognitive tendency where lack of information affects decision making

The ambiguity effect is a cognitive tendency where decision making is affected by a lack of information, or "ambiguity". The effect implies that people tend to select options for which the probability of a favorable outcome is known, over an option for which the probability of a favorable outcome is unknown. The effect was first described by Daniel Ellsberg in 1961.

This effect manifests in three distinct behavioural patterns including ambiguity aversion, in which individuals prefer known probabilities; ambiguity seeking in which individuals prefer unknown probabilities; and ambiguity neutrality in which individuals show no preference between either. Most people favour ambiguity-aversion (47% favoured ambiguity avoidance compared to 19% for ambiguity seeking). Ellsberg’s experiments challenged the traditional economic assumption that individuals make rational and consistent decisions. As a cognitive bias, the ambiguity effect reflects a systematic tendency to avoid unknown probabilities, deviating from rational decision making which has been documented across multiple experimental studies.

Key causes include lack of information and high perceived risk. Underlying mechanisms include anchoring and adjustment, in which individuals modify judgements from an initial probability estimate, and the bounded subadditivity principle, in which subjective probabilities assigned to outcomes do not sum to 1.0.

Research implications span legal, medical and educational settings. Legal contexts explain the likelihood of crime deterrence under ambiguity. In medicine it influences treatment decisions under diagnostic uncertainty. In education, ambiguity aversion in career decision-making has been linked to reduced life satisfaction and job search efficacy in college students.

== Example ==
As an example, consider a bucket containing 30 balls. The balls are either red, black or white. Ten of the balls are red, and the remaining 20 are either black or white, with all combinations of black and white being equally likely. In option X, drawing a red ball wins a person $100, and in option Y, drawing a black ball wins them $100. The probability of picking a winning ball is the same for both options X and Y. In option X, the probability of selecting a winning ball is 1 in 3 (10 red balls out of 30 total balls). In option Y, despite the fact that the number of black balls is uncertain, the probability of selecting a winning ball is also 1 in 3. This is because the number of black balls is equally distributed among all possibilities between 0 and 20. The difference between the two options is that in option X, the probability of a favorable outcome is known, but in option Y, the probability of a favorable outcome is unknown ("ambiguous").

In spite of the equal probability of a favorable outcome, people have a greater tendency to select a ball under option X, where the probability of selecting a winning ball is perceived to be more certain. The uncertainty as to the number of black balls means that option Y tends to be viewed less favorably. Despite the fact that there could possibly be twice as many black balls as red balls, people tend not to want to take the opposing risk that there may be fewer than 10 black balls. The "ambiguity" behind option Y means that people tend to favor option X, even when the probability is the same.

== Potential Causes and Mechanisms ==
=== Causes ===
==== Heuristics ====
One possible explanation of the effect is that people have a rule of thumb (heuristic) to avoid options where information is missing. This will often lead them to seek out the missing information. In many cases, though, the information cannot be obtained. The effect is often the result of calling attention to a missing piece of information.

==== Lack of information ====
Insufficient information increases uncertainty about outcomes leading individuals to conform to the ambiguity effect. New technologies, which lack historical performance data, may intensify this effect, leading individuals to prefer known technologies over ambiguous ones.

==== Long-run risk ====
Over time, repeated gambles in ambiguous situations may lead to more variance in outcomes than unambiguous situations. For example, Frisch and Baron (1988) outlined how in an ambiguous situation, where the proportions of black and white marbles are unknown, there may be 100 black marbles and 100 white marbles in an urn and the bettor must only choose one colour for 100 trials. However, in the same situation with a known composition of 50 black marbles and 50 white marbles, the outcome is more likely to reveal an even split. This asymmetry provides a rational basis for preferring known over ambiguous probabilities.

=== Mechanisms ===
==== Anchoring and Adjustment strategy ====
Anchoring and adjustment involves relying on an initial probability estimate and modifying judgements from this point. Evidence from the Ellsberg Paradox demonstrates that decision-making under ambiguity is influenced not only by the prospect of winning but also by the perceived reliability of available information. Anchors may be formed from expert estimates, salient memory or prior information. In Ellsberg's Urn Puzzle, 34-56% of participants stayed at the initial anchor throughout the experiment.

==== Mental simulation ====
Individuals use mental simulation in anchoring probabilities for a rough estimate on outcomes. The nonadditivity principle describes how subjective probabilities across all outcomes do not sum to 1.0, contrasting standard mathematical explanations. This is due to people either exhibiting optimism, leading to superadditivity, or pessimism, lead to subadditivity. This mechanism involves individuals either resorting to ambiguity-aversion (where they anchor at lower probabilities that sum to <1) or ambiguity-seeking (where they anchor at higher probabilities that sum to >1). This principle is consistent with prospect theory's concept of bounded subadditivity, where people respond more strongly at probability extremes.

== Real-world Application ==
=== Legal ===
Barnum and Nagin (2021) investigated whether ambiguity about punishment certainty deters crime independently. Participants rated their perceived chance of being caught speeding alongside their confidence in that estimate. When participants perceived a low chance of getting caught (below 18%), increased ambiguity deterred speeding – uncertainty made them more cautious. However, when participants already perceived a higher chance of getting caught (above 18%), increased ambiguity had the opposite effect, making them more willing to speed as uncertainty offered hope of avoiding punishment.

=== Medical ===
Clinical uncertainty causes variations in treatments a doctor would recommend. Where the doctor is uncertain of a patient’s condition, ambiguity aversion is smaller as it is preferable to treat the condition despite an absence of illness as side effects are small. Where there is uncertainty of the treatment’s success, ambiguity aversion is higher as the treatment could worsen the patient’s condition.

=== Education ===
Ambiguity aversion has measurable consequences for students’ career outcomes. Students who were ambiguity-averse in career decision-making at the start of college reported lower life satisfaction and reduced job search self-efficacy by the end of college. This operated through commitment anxiety – ambiguity-averse students became anxious about committing to career paths, inhibiting career exploration and decision making.

Dysfunctional career beliefs, e.g., over-reliance on external guidance, were also found to exhibit ambiguity aversion. This negatively predicted career decidedness, career commitment and major satisfaction.

== Criticisms ==
Ellsberg’s explanation attributes ambiguity aversion due to a dislike in the lack of knowledge. Loss-framing studies challenge Ellsberg's account, showing that whilst choosing between gains summons an ambiguity averse approach, choosing between losses produces the opposite effect. An ambiguity-seeking individual may be more hopeful to incur a smaller loss with a larger unknown probability than a known probability of losing.

Experimental limitations such as the artificiality of Ellsberg’s urn study potentially provides inaccurate measurement of the ambiguity effect on individuals and limited application in real world contexts. Individual characteristics explained only 3% of variation in ambiguity behaviours when measured with Ellsberg urns compared to 23% when measured using real-world investment decisions.

Ellsberg’s account does not demonstrate cases where individuals actively prefer ambiguous options. Heath and Tversky’s competence effect demonstrates that individuals are more likely to bet on their own judgement than a lottery with the same probabilities. One experiment found that students were willing to pay 20% more to bet on familiar topics e.g., distances between US cities than on unfamiliar ones e.g., distances between foreign cities. Perceived competence is a factor Ellsberg's account does not address.

== See also ==
- Ambiguity aversion
- Black swan theory
- Choice under uncertainty
- Ellsberg paradox
- Prospect theory
- Risk aversion
- VUCA
