= Ben Polak =

British economist (born 1961)

Provost of Yale University
- In office 2013–2020
- Preceded by: Peter Salovey
- Succeeded by: Scott Strobel

Personal details
- Born: 22 December 1961 (age 64)
- Education: Trinity College, Cambridge (BA); Northwestern University (MA); Harvard University (PhD)
- Scientific career
- Children: 3
- Awards: DeVane Medal (2005) for teaching
- Fields: decision theory, game theory and economic history
- Institutions: New Economic School; University of Melbourne; Yale University
- Thesis: Problems from the history of capital markets (1992)
- Doctoral advisor: Jeffrey G. Williamson
- Doctoral students: Marzena Rostek

Benjamin "Ben" Polak (born 22 December 1961) is a British professor of economics and management and former provost at Yale University. From 1999 to 2001 Polak was the Henry Kohn Associate Professor of Economics and is now the inaugural William C. Brainard Professor of Economics. In January 2013, he became the Provost of Yale University.

Polak specialises in microeconomic theory, has published 19 peer-reviewed papers in leading journals, and is an associate editor of the Journal of Economic Theory.

In 2021 it was reported that Polak was responsible for Yale's decision to terminate the Yale Boswell Editions project, founded in 1949.

== Courses taught ==
In fall 2007, Polak participated in the Open Yale Courses initiative, recording the 24 lecture series and making all course materials freely available on the Internet. Polak describes the motivation for his participation in the scheme as delivering an Ivy League standard education to a wider audience, "It’s not the full Yale experience, unfortunately, but it’s something."
