= Scott Strobel =

Biochemist (born 1961)

Provost of Yale University
- Incumbent
- Assumed office 2020
- Preceded by: Ben Polak

Personal details
- Born: December 22, 1961 (age 64)
- Education: Brigham Young University (BA); California Institute of Technology (PhD)
- Scientific career
- Known for: Rainforest Expedition Lab
- Fields: Molecular biology Biochemistry
- Workplaces: Yale University
- Thesis: Site-specific cleavage of genomic DNA mediated by triple helix formation (1992)
- Doctoral advisor: Peter Dervan
- Other academic advisors: Thomas Cech

Scott Allen Strobel is the provost of Yale University as well as a professor of molecular biophysics and biochemistry. He was the vice provost for Science Initiatives and vice president for West Campus Planning & Program Development. An educator and researcher, he has led a number of Yale initiatives over the past two decades. Strobel was appointed as Yale's provost in 2020.

== Career ==
Strobel earned a bachelor's degree in biochemistry from Brigham Young University and a Ph.D. in biology from the California Institute of Technology, under the guidance of Peter Dervan, before doing postdoctoral research at the University of Colorado, Boulder, under the mentorship of Thomas Cech. He has been a professor with the Howard Hughes Medical Institute (HHMI) since 2006.

He joined the Yale faculty in 1995 in the Department of Molecular Biophysics & Biochemistry and served as department chair from 2006 to 2009. Since 2011, he has served as vice president for West Campus Planning & Program Development, where he has directed the expansion of the West Campus as a research and educational center. In 2014, he also became the inaugural deputy provost for Teaching & Learning. In this capacity, he has overseen the creation of the Yale Poorvu Center for Teaching and Learning, housed within the Sterling Memorial Library. The center provides teaching resources and support to Yale faculty, postdocs, graduate students and undergraduate students.

== Research and teaching ==
Strobel's research focuses on the biophysics and biochemistry of catalytic RNAs, including riboswitches and peptidyl transferase. His group developed the early methods of Nucleotide Analog Interference Mapping, used to determine the importance of particular functional groups in a structured RNA molecule. Strobel's group solved the x-ray crystal structure of the full length Azoarcus Group I catalytic intron, the glmS ribozyme, and the c-di-GMP riboswitch. He has also collaborated with the Thomas A. Steitz lab at Yale on structural studies toward better understanding the mechanism of ribosomal peptide synthesis.

He was twice named a HHMI professor to promote undergraduate science education. With this award he instituted an undergraduate research course, the Rainforest Expedition and Laboratory, which explored microbial and chemical diversity in the world's rainforests as a means to inspire undergraduate students in the sciences. He has led groups of undergraduate students into the rainforest over spring break to hunt for novel endophytes that live inside plants. Following fieldwork, students then isolated microbes and tested them for interesting properties, discovering a variety of organisms including novel fungi with new biological and chemical properties, including Pestalotiopsis microspora, of which some strains degrade polyurethane.

== Awards and honors ==
Strobel has received Beckman, Searle and Basil O'Connor career awards. He received the Dylan Hixon Prize for Teaching Excellence in the Natural Sciences. He also received the Yale Graduate Mentoring Award in the Sciences. He received the Yale Science and Engineering Association Award for Meritorious Service to Yale University.

== Personal ==
Strobel and his son run a small hobby business crafting remnants of campus trees into various lathed items.
