= Elisha Pazner =

Former Israeli economist and game theorist

- אלישע פזנר
- Born: April 16, 1941; Geneva, Switzerland
- Died: March 28, 1979 (aged 37); Jerusalem, Israel
- Known for: Egalitarian equivalence

Academic work
- Discipline: Economics
- Institutions: Tel Aviv University; Northwestern University

Elisha Aryeh Pazner (Hebrew: אלישע פזנר; April 16, 1941 – March 28, 1979) was an Israeli economic- and game theorist with important contributions in the theory of welfare economics and fair division. He was a member of the Department of Economics at Tel-Aviv University from 1971 until his death. During this time he spent over two years as a visiting professor at Northwestern University.

He received his B.A., Economics from the Hebrew University of Jerusalem (1966), and his M.A. and PhD from Harvard University (1969 and 1971 respectively). His Dissertation, "Optimal Resource Allocation and Distribution: The Role of the Public Sector", was under the direction of Richard Musgrave and Stephen Marglin.
