= Balance (apportionment) =

Balance or balancedness is a property of apportionment methods, which are methods of allocating identical items among agents, such as dividing seats in a parliament among political parties or federal states. The property says that, if two agents have exactly the same entitlements, then the number of items they receive should differ by at most one. So if two parties win the same number of votes, or two states have the same populations, then the number of seats they receive should differ by at most one.

Ideally, agents with identical entitlements should receive an identical number of items, but this may be impossible due to the indivisibility of the items. Balancedness requires that the difference between identical-entitlement agents should be the smallest difference allowed by the indivisibility, which is 1. For example, if there are 2 equal-entitlement agents and 9 items, then the allocations (4,5) and (5,4) are both allowed, but the allocations (3,6) or (6,3) are not - a difference of 3 is not justified even by indivisibility.

== Definitions ==
There is a resource to allocate, denoted by $h$. For example, it can be an integer representing the number of seats in a house of representatives. The resource should be allocated between some $n$ agents, such as states or parties. The agents have different entitlements, denoted by a vector $t_1,\ldots,t_n$. For example, t_{i} can be the fraction of votes won by party i. An allocation is a vector $a_1,\ldots,a_n$ with $\sum_{i=1}^n a_i = h$. An allocation rule is a rule that, for any $h$ and entitlement vector $t_1,\ldots,t_n$, returns an allocation vector $a_1,\ldots,a_n$.

An allocation rule is called balanced if $t_i = t_j$ implies $|a_i-a_j|\leq 1$ for all i,j. Equivalently, $t_i = t_j$ implies $a_i\geq a_j-1$ for all i,j.

== Properties ==
All known apportionment methods are balanced. In particular, both Highest averages methods and Largest remainder methods are balanced.

Every apportionment method that is anonymous, exact and coherent, is also balanced.
