= Concordance (apportionment) =

Principle in election systems

Static population-monotonicity, also called concordance, says that a party with more votes should not receive a smaller apportionment of seats. Failures of concordance are often called electoral inversions or majority reversals.

This phenomenon has been widely observed in elections in the UK, in which the first-past-the-post system has produced strange results, with huge gaps between the votes a party receives and the seats it receives. In the 2024 General Election, Reform UK won 14.3% of the popular vote (the third-highest share nationally) but only received 5 seats (0.7% of Parliament). Whilst, the Liberal Democrats won 12.2% of the vote—fewer than Reform UK—but won 72 seats.

Vote share at the 2024 United Kingdom general election
Reform UK	14.3%
Liberal Democrats	12.2%

Seats won at the 2024 United Kingdom general election
Liberal Democrats	11.1%
Reform UK	0.8%

Examples of a full electoral inversion, the second-place party (in votes nationally) winning a majority of seats include the elections in Ghana in 2012, New Zealand in 1978 and 1981, and the United Kingdom in 1951.
