= Symmetry (social choice) =

Requirement of a social choice rule

In economics and social choice, a function satisfies symmetry, neutrality, or anonymity if the rule does not discriminate between different participants ahead of time. For example, in an election, a voter-anonymous function is one where it does not matter who casts which vote, i.e. all voters' ballots are equal ahead of time. Formally, this is defined by saying the rule returns the same outcome (whatever this may be) if the votes are "relabeled" arbitrarily, e.g. by swapping votes #1 and #2. Similarly, outcome-neutrality says the rule does not discriminate between different outcomes (e.g. candidates) ahead of time. Formally, if the labels assigned to each outcome are permuted arbitrarily, the returned result is permuted in the same way.

Some authors reserve the term anonymity for agent symmetry and neutrality for outcome-symmetry, but this pattern is not perfectly consistent.

== Examples ==
Most voting rules are anonymous and neutral by design. For example, plurality voting is anonymous and neutral, since only counts the number of first-preferences for each candidate, regardless of who cast these votes.

Any rule that uses a secret ballot must be voter-anonymous, since they do not know which voter cast which vote. However, the converse is not true (as in e.g. roll call votes).

=== Non-examples ===
An example of a non-neutral rule is a rule which says that, in case of a tie, the alternative X is selected. This is particularly prominent in cases where X is the status quo option: parliamentary procedures often specify that the status quo unless there is a strict majority against it. Other rules are non-anonymous in the case of a tied vote, e.g. when a chairman is allowed to break ties.

However, not all violations of anonymity and neutrality are due to tied votes. For example, many motions require a supermajority to pass, and other rules can give certain stakeholders a veto. The United States' electoral college is a well-known example of a non-anonymous voting rule, as the results of the election depend not just on the votes for each candidate, but also on their physical arrangement across space.

Weighted voting rules are non-anonymous, as they give some voters a higher weight than others, for example, due to their expertise or entitlement.

== See also ==
- One man, one vote
- Fair election
