= Budget-proposal aggregation =

Decision rules for participatory budgeting

Budget-proposal aggregation (BPA) is a problem in social choice theory. A group has to decide on how to distribute its budget among several issues. Each group-member has a different idea about what the ideal budget-distribution should be. The problem is how to aggregate the different opinions into a single budget-distribution program.

BPA is a special case of participatory budgeting, with the following characteristics:

1. The issues are divisible and unbounded – each issue can be allocated any amount, as long as the sum of allocations equals the total budget.
2. Agents' preferences are given by single-peaked preferences over an ideal budget.

It is also a special case of fractional social choice (portioning), in which agents express their preferences by stating their ideal distribution, rather than by a ranking of the issues.

Another sense in which aggregation in budgeting has been studied is as follows. Suppose a manager asks his worker to submit a budget-proposal for a project. The worker can over-report the project cost, in order to get the slack to himself. Knowing that, the manager might reject the worker's proposal when it is too high, even though the high cost might be real. To mitigate this effect, it is possible to ask the worker for aggregate budget-proposals (for several projects at once). The experiment shows that this approach can indeed improve the efficiency of the process.

The same problem has been studied in the context of aggregating probability distributions. Suppose each citizen in society has a certain probability-distribution over candidates, representing the probability that the citizen prefers each candidate. The goal is to aggregate all distributions to a single probability-distribution, representing the probability that society should choose each candidate.

== Rules for the one-dimensional case ==
The one-dimensional case is the special case in which there are only two issues, e.g. defense and education. In this case, distributions can be represented by a single parameter: the allocation to issue #1 (the allocation to issue #2 is simply the total budget minus the allocation to issue #1). It is natural to assume that the agents have single-peaked preferences, that is: between two options that are both larger, or both smaller, than their ideal allocation, they prefer the option that is closer to their ideal allocation.

This setting is similar to a one-dimensional facility location problem: a certain facility (e.g. a public school) has to be built on a line; each voter has an ideal spot on the line in which the facility should be built (nearest to his own house); and the problem is to aggregate the voters' preferences and decide where on the line the facility should be built.

=== The average rule ===
The average voting rule is an aggregation rule that simply returns the arithmetic mean of all individual distributions. It is the unique rule that satisfies the following three axioms:

- Completeness: for every n distributions, the rule returns a distribution.
- Unanimity for losers: if an issue receives 0 in all individual distributions, then it receives 0 in the collective distribution.
- Strict and equal sensitivity to individual allocations: if one voter increases his allocation to one issue, while all other allocations remain the same, then the collective allocation to this issue strictly increases; moreover, the rate of increase is the same for all voters – it depends only on the issue.

But the average rule is not incentive-compatible, and is very easy to manipulate. For example, suppose there are two issues, the ideal distribution of Alice is (80%, 20%), and the average of the ideal distributions of the other voters is (60%, 40%). Then Alice would be better-off by reporting that her ideal distribution is (100%, 0%), since this will pull the average distribution closer to her ideal distribution.

=== The median rule ===
The median voting rule for the one-dimensional case is an aggregation rule that returns the median of the ideal budgets of all citizens. It has several advanatages:

- Assuming the agents' preferences are single-peaked, the median rule is strategyproof, and even group strategyproof.
- Assuming further that each agent's utility function is minus the distance between his ideal allocation and the chosen allocation, the median rule is utilitarian – it maximizes the sum of agents' utilities. This also implies that it is Pareto efficient.

But the median rule may be considered unfair, as it ignores the minority opinion. For example, suppose the two issues are "investment in the north" vs. "investment in the south". 49% of the population live in the north and therefore their ideal distribution is (100%,0%), while 51% of the population live in the south and therefore their ideal distribution is (0%,100%), The median rule selects the distribution (0%,100%), which is unfair for the citizens living in the north.

This fairness notion is captured by proportionality (PROP), which means that, if all agents are single-minded (want either 0% or 100%), then the allocation equals the fraction of agents who want 100%. The average rule is PROP but not strategyproof; the median rule is strategyproof but not PROP.

=== Median with phantoms ===
The median rule can be generalized by adding fixed votes, that do not depend on the citizen votes. These fixed votes are called "phantoms". For every set of phantoms, the rule that chooses the median of the set of real votes + phantoms is strategyproof; see median voting rule for examples and characterization.

The Uniform Phantom median rule (UPM) is a special case of the median rule, with n-1 phantoms at 1/n, ..., (n-1)/n. This rule is strategyproof (like all phantom-median rules), but in addition, it is also proportional. It has several characerizations:

- UPM is the only rule satisfying continuity, anonymity, strategyproofness and proportionality among all symmetric single-peaked preferences.
- UPM is the only rule satisfying strategyproofness and proportionality among all single-peaked preferences.

=== Proportional fairness ===
Aziz, Lam, Lee and Walsh study the special case in which the preferences are single-peaked and symmetric, that is: each agent compares alternatives only by their distance from his ideal point, regardless of the direction. In particular, they assume that each agent's utility is 1 minus the distance between his ideal point and the chosen allocation. They consider several fairness axioms:

- Individual fair share (IFS) means that each agent's utility is at least 1/n (that is, the distance from his ideal point to the allocation is at most 1-1/n);
- Proportionality means that, if all agents are single-minded and want either 0% or 100%, then the allocation equals the fraction of agents who want 100%.
- Unanimity means that, if all agents agree on an allocation, then this allocation should be chosen.
- Unanimous fair share (UFS) means that, for each group of size k with exactly the same ideal point, the utility of each group member is at least k/n (this is analogous to requirements of justified representation).
  - UFS implies IFS (take k=1), unanimity (take k=n) and proportionality (take k=number of agents whose ideal point is 100%).
- Proportional fairness (PF) means that, for each group of size k with ideal points in an interval of radius r, the utility of each group member is at least k/n-r. PF implies UFS (take r=0). All implications are strict.

The following is known about existing rules:

- The median rule is strategyproof. It satisfies unanimity, but not IFS or PROP (hence not UFS or PF).
- The egalitarian rule (- selecting the midpoint between the smallest and largest ideal point) satisfies unanimity and IFS, but not PROP (hence not UFS or PF). It is also not strategyproof.
- The Nash rule (- selecting an allocation that maximizes the product of agents' utilities) satisfies PF (hence all other fairness properties), but it is not strategyproof.
- The uniform phantom median rule satisfies PF (hence all other fairness properties), and it is also strategyproof.

They prove the following characterizations:

- Every rule that satisfies IFS, unanimity, anonymity and strategyproofness is a phantom-median mechanism with n-1 phantoms between 1/n and 1-1/n.
- The only rule that satisfies PROP, unanimity and strategyproofness is the Uniform Phantom median rule. Hence, the only rule that satisfies UFS/PF and strategyproofness is UPM.

Border and Jordan prove that the only rule satisfying continuity, anonymity, proportionality and strategyproofness is UPM.

=== Average vs. median ===
Rosar compares the average rule to the median rule when the voters have diverse private information and interdependent preferences. For uniformly distributed information, the average report dominates the median report from a utilitarian perspective, when the set of admissible reports is designed optimally. For general distributions, the results still hold when there are many agents.

== Rules for the multi-dimensional case ==
When there are more than two issues, the space of possible budget-allocations is multi-dimensional. Extending the median rule to the multi-dimensional case is challenging, since the sum of the medians might be different than the median of the sum. In other words, if we pick the median on each issue separately, we might not get a feasible distribution.

In the multi-dimensional case, aggregation rules depend on assumptions on the utility functions of the voters.

== L1 utilities ==
A common assumption is that the utility of voter i, with ideal budget (peak) p_{i}, from a given budget allocation x, is minus the L1-distance between p_{i} and x. Under this assumption, several aggregation rules were studied.

=== Utilitarian rules ===
Lindner, Nehring and Puppe consider BPA with discrete amounts (e.g. whole dollars). They define the midpoint rule: it chooses a budget-allocation that minimizes the sum of L1-distances to the voters' peaks. In other words, it maximizes the sum of utilities – it is a utilitarian rule. They prove that the set of midpoints is convex, and that it is locally determined (one can check if a point is a midpoint only by looking at its neighbors in the simplex of allocations). Moreover, they prove that the possibility of strategic manipulation is limited: a manipulating agent cannot make the closest midpoint closer to his peak, nor make the farthest midpoint closer to his peak. As a consequence, the midpoint rule is strategyproof if all agents have symmetric single-peaked preferences.

Goel, Krishnaswamy, Sakshuwong and Aitamurto consider BPA in the context of participatory budgeting with divisible projects: they propose to replace the common voting format of approving k projects with "knapsack voting". With discrete projects, this means that each voter has to select a set of projects whose total cost is at most the available budget; with divisible projects, this means that each voter reports his ideal budget-allocation. Now, each project is partitioned into individual "dollars"; for dollar j of project i, the number of votes is the total number of agents whose ideal budget gives at least j to project i. Given the votes, the knapsack-voting rule selects the dollars with the highest amount of support (as in utilitarian approval voting). They prove that, with L1-utilities, the knapsack voting is strategyproof and utilitarian (and hence efficient).

Both utilitarian rules are not "fair" in the sense that they may ignore minorities. For example, if 60% of the voters vote for the distribution (100%,0%) whereas 40% vote for (0%,100%), then the utilitarian rules would choose (100%,0%) and give nothing to the issue important for the minority.

=== Moving phantoms rules ===
Freeman, Pennock, Peters and Vaughan suggest a class of rules called moving-phantoms rules, where there are n+1 phantoms that increase continuously until the outcome equals the total budget. They prove that all these rules are strategyproof. The proof proceeds in two steps. (1) If an agent changes his reported peak, but all the phantoms are fixed in place, then we have a median voting rule in each issue, so the outcome in each issue either stays the same or goes farther from the agent's real peak. (2) as the phantoms move, the outcome in some issues may move nearer to the agent's real peak, but the agent's gain from this is at most the agent's loss in step 1. Note that the proof of (2) crucially relies on the assumption of L1 utilities, and does not work with other distance metrics such as L2 metric. A demo of some particular moving-phantoms mechanisms is available online.

=== Disproportionality of BPA rules ===
Arguably, the fairest budget distribution is the average of all peaks, as it gives each voter exactly 1/n influence over the budget. However, it cannot be attained by a truthful mechanism. A natural reaction to this is to seek BPA rules that return an outcome that is as close as possible to the average. Formally, one can define the disproportionality of a distribution as its distance from the average of peaks, and look for rules that return outcomes with a small disproportionality.

Caragiannis, Christodoulou and Protopapas define the disproportionality of a budget distribution as its L1 distance from the average. The disproportionality of any budget-allocation is between 0 and 2. They evaluate BPA mechanisms by their worst-case disproportionality:

- In BPA with two issues, UPM has worst-case disproportionality 1/2.
- With 3 issues, the independent-markets mechanism may have disproportionality 0.6862.
- They propose a moving-phantoms mechanism called Piecewise-Uniform is still proportional, and has disproportionality ~2/3.
- They prove that the worst-case disproportionality of a MPM on m issues is at least 1-1/m, and the worst-case disproportionality of any truthful mechanism is at least 1/2; this implies that their mechanisms attain the optimal disproportionality.

Freeman and Schmidt-Kraepelin define disproportionality as the L-infinity distance from the average (i.e., the maximum difference per issue, rather than the sum of differences). They define a new MPM called the Ladder rule, which underfunds a project by at most 1/2-1/(2m), and overfunds a project by at most 1/4; both bounds are tight for moving-phantoms rules.

=== Other rules ===
There are non-MPM rules that are anonymous, neutral, continuous and strategyproof, even for n=1 voter. One class of such rules, defined for any number of voters, is the class of cutoff-phantom mechanisms.

Elkind, Suksompong and Teh define various axioms for BPA with L1-disutilities, analyze the implications between axioms, and determine which axioms are satisfied by common aggregation rules. They study two classes of rules: those based on coordinate-wise aggregation (average, maximum, minimum, median, product), and those based on global optimization (utilitarian, egalitarian).

== Leontief utilities ==
Brandt, Greger, Segal-Halevi and Suksompong introduced a different utility model, based on Leontief preferences. In their model, an agent evaluates a budget by taking the smallest (over all issues) ratio between the funding given to that issue and the ideal funding for that issue. This model is not metric (in particular, there is no symmetry between the ideal budget and the actual budget). They show that, for this utility model, the Nash welfare rule is the unique rule that is group-strategyproof and satisfies core-fair-share. This is in contrast to the case of L1 and L-infinity utilities, for which they show that no mechanism satisfies proportionality, Pareto-efficiency and strategyproofness.

== General preferences ==
Barbera and Peleg proved that any BPA rule which is strategyproof on the set of all continuous utility functions, and whose range has more than two alternatives, must be a dictatorship. This can be seen as an analogue of the Gibbard–Satterthwaite theorem for BPA.

Nehring and Puppe showed that the existence of strategyproof non-dictatorial rules requires an underlying median space --- defined as a space where for every triple of elements, there is a fourth element that is "between" each of the three pair (by some abstract notion of "betweenness").

== Convex preferences ==
When agents may have arbitrary preferences, the Gibbard–Satterthwaite theorem says that any strategyproof mechanism with 3 or more possible outcomes is dictatorial. Zhou strengthened this theorem: he proved that, when the space of alternatives is an arbitrary convex subset of some finite-dimensional Euclidean space, then even if the agents' utilities are restricted to convex quadratic utilities, every strategyproof mechanism whose image has dimension at least 2 is dictatorial. Barbera and Jackson complemented Zhou's result by characterizing the strategyproof mechanisms whose image has dimension 1.

Nehring and Puppe aim to derive decision rules with as few assumptions as possible on agents' preferences; they call this the frugal model. They assume that the social planner knows the agents' peaks, but does not know their exact preferences; this leads to uncertainty regarding how many people prefer an alternative x to an alternative y.

Given two alternatives x and y, x is a necessary majority winner if it wins over y according to all preferences in the domain that are consistent with the agents' peaks; x is majority admissible if no other alternative is a necessary-majority-winner over x. Given two alternatives x and y, x is an ex-ante majority winner if its smallest possible number of supporters is at least as high as the smallest possible number of supporters of y, which holds iff its largest possible number of supporters is at least as high as the largest possible number of supporters of y. x is an ex-ante Condorcet winner (EAC) if it is an ex-ante majority winner over every other alternative.

They assume that agents' preferences are convex, which in one dimension is equivalent to single-plateau. But convexity alone is not enough to attain meaningful results in two or more dimensions (if the peaks are in general position, then all peaks are EAC winners). So they consider two subsets of convex preferences: homogenous quadratic preferences, and separable convex preferences.

- In the homogeneous quadratic model, an EAC winner always exists and it is always a Tukey median.
- In the separable convex model, an EAC winner may not exist, but a "local" EAC winner exists and it minimizes the sum of L1 -distances to the agents’ peaks. This solution can be efficiently computed using a spreadsheet. Note that, even with separable convex preferences, the only strategyproof rules are dictatorships.

They study BPA allowing lower and upper bounds on the spending on each issue.

Fain, Goel and Munagala assume that agents have additive concave utility functions, which represent convex preferences over bundles. In particular, for each agent i and issue j there is a coefficient a_{i,j}, and for each issue j there is an increasing and strictly concave function g_{j}; the total utility of agent i from budget allocation x is: $u_i(x) = \sum_{j=1}^m a_{i,j}\cdot g_j(x_j)$. They study the Lindahl equilibrium of this problem, prove that it is in the core (which is a strong fairness property), and show that it can be computed in polynomial time.

Wagner and Meir study a generalization of BPA in which each agent may propose, in addition to a budget-allocation, also an amount t of tax (positive or negative) that will be taken from all agents and added to the budget. For each agent i there is a coefficient a_{i,f} that represents the utility of monetary gains and losses, and there is a function f which is strictly convex for negative values and strictly concave for positive values, and $u_i(x,d) = \sum_{j=1}^m a_{i,j}\cdot g_j(x_j) + a_{i,f}\cdot f(d)$, where d is the monetary gain (which can be negative). For this utility model, they present a variant of the Vickrey–Clarke–Groves mechanism that is strategyproof, but requires side-payments (in addition to the tax).

== Empirical evidence ==
Puppe and Rollmann present a lab experiment comparing the average voting rule and a normalized median voting rule in multidimensional budget aggregation setting. Under the average rule, people act in equilibrium when the equilibrium strategies are easily identifiable. Under normalized median rule, many people play best responses, but these best responses are usually not exactly truthful. Still, the median rule attains much higher social welfare than the average rule.

== See also ==
- Belief aggregation – a similar problem in which experts report probability distributions, and the goal is to select a single probability distribution aggregating their different opinions.
- Fractional approval voting - a similar problem in which a "budget" of 1 (probability) has to be allocated among several candidates. There, agents submit approval ballots rather than ideal distributions.
- Spatial model of voting – another model in which agents' preferences are fully determined by their top choice.
- Star-shaped preferences – a natural class of preferences for budget aggregation.
- Efficiently computing equilibria in budget-aggregation games.
