= Revue économique =

- Discipline: Economics
- Language: English, French
- Edited by: David Margolis

Publication details
- History: 1950-present
- Publisher: Presses de Sciences Po (France)
- Frequency: Bimonthly
- Open access: Delayed, after 1 year

Standard abbreviations
- ISO 4: Rev. Écon.

Indexing
- ISSN: 0035-2764 (print); 1950-6694 (web)
- LCCN: 52016395
- JSTOR: 00352764
- OCLC no.: 708221211

Links
- Journal homepage; All the articles since 2001 on Cairn; All the articles on Jstor; Online archive on Persée 1950-2000

The Revue économique is a peer-reviewed academic journal published six times per year. It covers formal economics and other social sciences including history and sociology of relevance for economics. Articles are in French or English.

== History ==
The first issue of the Revue économique was published in May 1950. Founders included economic historian Fernand Braudel, Albert Aftalion, who presided over the journal's board of directors ("comité de direction"). and Émile James (1899–1991), Étienne Labrousse (1895–1989), Jean Lhomme (1901–1987), Jean Marchal (1905–1995), Jean Meynaud (1914–1972), Henri Noyelle (1882–1966), Jean Weiller (1905–2000). Until 1977, the journal was published by Armand Colin and since 1978 by the Presses de Sciences Po.

Some of the authors who have published articles in the journal include: John Abowd, Raymond Aron, Raymond Barre, Charles Bettelheim, François Bloch-Lainé, Roger Guesnerie, Francis Kramarz, Denis Kessler, Serge Christophe Kolm, Jean-Jacques Laffont, Wassily Léontief, Edmond Malinvaud, Pierre Mendès-France, Alfred Sauvy, Dominique Strauss-Kahn, Jacques Rueff, Jan Tinbergen, Jean Tirole.

== Prize of the Revue économique ==
Every two years, the Prize is awarded to an author who published in the journal, for the whole of his/her work.

- 2012: Claude Henry
- 2014: Marc Fleurbaey
- 2016: David Martimort
- 2018: Marie Claire Villeval
- 2020: Philippe Mongin
- 2022: Jean-Marc Robin
- 2024: Katheline Schubert
