= Doctrinal paradox =

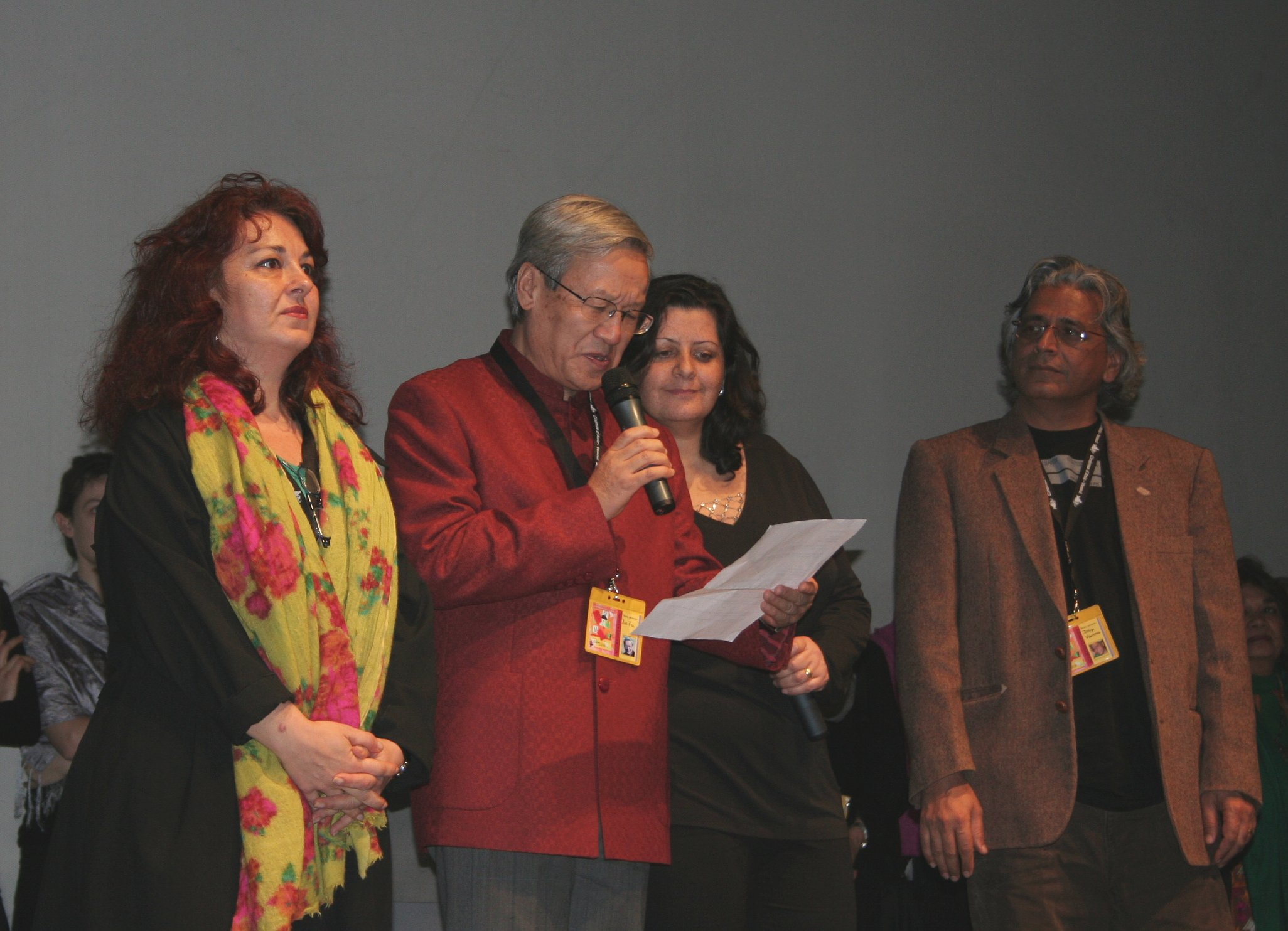
The same group will offer a majority vote for, as well as against, a plan depending on how the group is polled.

The discursive dilemma or doctrinal paradox is a paradox of social choice and judgement aggregation. It extends the voting paradox and Arrow's theorem to situations where the goal is to combine different sources of information or judgments, rather than preferences. The paradox is that aggregating judgments with majority voting can result in self-contradictory judgments.

Consider a community voting on road repairs asked three questions; the repairs go ahead if all three answers are 'Yes'. The questions are: "Are the roads important?", "Is the weather right for road repair?" and "Are there available funds for repairs?" Imagine that three (non-overlapping) groups of 20% of people vote 'No' for each question, and everyone else votes 'Yes'. Then each question has an 80% agreement of 'Yes', so the repairs go ahead. However, now consider the situation where the community are asked one question: "Are all three conditions (importance, weather and funds) met?" Now 60% of people disagree with one of these conditions, so only 40% agree on a 'Yes' vote. In this case, the repairs do not go ahead. Thus the road repair team gets different feedback depending on how they poll their community.

In general, any decision that is not unanimous can be logically self-contradictory.

== Overview ==
The doctrinal paradox shows it is difficult to construct a model of public opinion simply by identifying the majority opinion on multiple questions. This is because contradictory conceptions of a group can emerge depending on the type of questioning that is chosen.

	P	Q	P & Q
Juror 1	yes	yes	yes
Juror 2	no	yes	no
Juror 3	yes	no	no
Majority decision	yes	yes	no

To see how, imagine that a three-member court must decide whether someone is liable for a breach of contract. For example, a lawn caretaker is accused of violating a contract not to mow over the land-owner's roses. The jurors must decide which of the following propositions are true:

- P: the defendant performed a certain action (i.e. did the caretaker mow over the roses?);
- Q: the defendant had a contractual obligation not to do that action (i.e. was there a contract not to mow over the roses?);
- C: the defendant is liable.

Additionally, all judges accept the proposition $C \equiv P \land Q$. In other words, the judges agree that a defendant should be liable if and only if the two propositions, P and Q, are both true.

Each judge could make consistent (non-contradictory) judgments, and the paradox will still emerge. Most judges could think P is true, and most judges could think Q is true. In this example, that means they would vote that the caretaker probably mowed over the roses, and that the contract did indeed forbid that action. This suggests the caretaker is liable.

At the same time, most judges may think that P and Q are not both true at once. In this example, that means most judges conclude the caretaker is not liable. The table above illustrates how majority decisions can contradict (because the judges vote in favor of the premises, and yet reject the conclusion).

== Explanation ==
This dilemma results because an actual decision-making procedure might be premise-based or conclusion-based. In a premise-based procedure, the judges decide by voting whether the conditions for liability are met. In a conclusion-based procedure, the judges decide directly whether the defendant should be liable. In the above formulation, the paradox is that the two procedures do not necessarily lead to the same result; the two procedures can even lead to opposite results.

Pettit believes that the lesson of this paradox is that there is no simple way to aggregate individual opinions into a single, coherent "group entity". These ideas are relevant to sociology, which endeavors to understand and predict group behaviour. Petitt warns that we need to understand groups because they can be very powerful, can effect greater change, and yet the group as a whole may not have a strong conscience (see Diffusion of responsibility). He says we sometimes fail to hold groups (e.g. corporations) responsible because of the difficulties described above. Collective responsibility is important to sort out, and Petitt insists that groups should have limited rights, and various obligations and checks on their power.

The discursive dilemma can be seen as a special case of the Condorcet paradox. List and Pettit argue that the discursive dilemma can be likewise generalized to a sort of "List–Pettit theorem". Their theorem states that the inconsistencies remain for any aggregation method which meets a few natural conditions.

== See also ==
- Multi-issue voting - similar to judgement aggregation in that voters have to decide on several related issues; different in that they vote according to their preferences, rather than according to their beliefs.
- Belief merging - similar to judgement aggregation in that there are several conflicting beliefs (represented as logical formulae) that have to be combined into a consistent database.
- Issue polling
