= Probabilistic voting =

Probabilistic voting may refer to:

- Probabilistic voting model, a model describing the behavior of voters and candidates under incomplete information (the voters are unsure about candidates' platforms, and the candidates are unsure about voters' preferences). Probabilistic voting models are studied in probabilistic voting theory.
- Probabilistic voting rule, a rule that takes as input the preferences of voters, and yields as output a probability distribution over candidates (rather than the single candidate returned by a usual voting rule). Probabilistic voting rules are studied in the theory of Fractional social choice. This is mostly a normative theory, aiming for developing rules that satisfy some desirable axiomatic properties.
