= Albert Aftalion =

French economist (1874–1956)

Albert Abram Aftalion (October 21, 1874, Rusçuk, Ottoman Empire – December 6, 1956, Geneva, Switzerland) was a French economist.

He taught at the Paris University (1925–1939). He co-founded the academic journal Revue économique in 1950 and presided over its board of directors.

== Works ==
- Les crises périodiques de surproduction, 1913

== Sources ==
- Encyclopaedia Judaica, art. "Aftalion, Albert"
- Nenovsky N, (2006). Exchange Rate and Inflation: France and Bulgaria in the Interwar Period and the Contribution of Albert Aftalion (1874-1956)
