= Norman Schofield =

Political scientist

Norman J. Schofield
- Born: January 30, 1944; Rothesay, Bute, Scotland
- Died: October 12, 2019 (aged 75); St. Louis, Missouri
- Education: Essex University; University of Liverpool
- Known for: McKelvey–Schofield chaos theorem
- Scientific career
- Fields: Political science
- Workplaces: Washington University in St. Louis

Norman James Schofield (January 30, 1944 – October 12, 2019) was a Scottish-American political scientist, the Dr. William Taussig Professor of Political Economy at the Washington University in St. Louis.

== Early life and education ==
Schofield earned two bachelor's degrees from the University of Liverpool; one in physics in 1965 and the other in mathematics in 1966. Later he obtained two PhDs from Essex University: the first in government in 1976 and the second in economics in 1985.

== Career ==
From 1970 to 1976, he was a lecturer in government at Essex University. He became an associate professor of government at the University of Texas at Austin 1976 to 1979. He then became a reader in economics at Essex University from 1979 to 1986.

He came to Washington University in 1986 as a fellow to the Center of Political Economy; became subsequently adjunct professor in 1989 and made full professor in 1996.

== Books ==
Schofield is the author or co-author of the following books:

- Mathematical Methods in Economics and Social Choice (New York University Press 1984, reprinted as Studies in Economic Theory 17, Springer, 2004, ISBN 978-3-540-21138-9)
- Social Choice and Democracy (Springer, 1985, ISBN 978-0-387-15604-0)
- Advanced Statistical Methods in the Social Sciences (with Whiteley, Satchell, and Chatterji; Praeger, 1986)
- Multiparty Government: the politics of coalition in Europe (with Michael Laver, Oxford University Press, 1990, reprinted by University of Michigan Press, 1998, ISBN 978-0-472-08562-0)
- Architects of Political Change: Constitutional Quandaries and Social Choice Theory (Cambridge University Press, 2006, ISBN 978-0-521-83202-1)
- Multiparty Democracy: Elections and Legislative Politics (with Itai Sened, Cambridge University Press, 2006, ISBN 978-0-521-45035-5)
- The Spatial Model of Politics (Routledge Series of Political Economy 95, Psychology Press, 2008, ISBN 978-0-415-32127-3)
- The Political Economy of Democracy and Tyranny (Oldenbourg, 2009, ISBN 978-3-486-58826-2)
- Leadership Or Chaos: The Heart and Soul of Politics (with Maria Gallego, Springer, 2011, ISBN 978-3-642-19515-0)

== Awards and recognitions ==
Schofield has been awarded honorary doctorates from the University of Liverpool in 1986, and from the University of Caen in 1992.

In 2002, Schofield won the William H. Riker Prize in political science "for his path-breaking contributions to the theory of collective choice in multidimensional settings, the extension of those results to the analysis of coalition politics in parliamentary systems, and, subsequently, to the analysis of American constitutional politics."

In 2005, he was elected as a fellow of the American Academy of Arts and Sciences.
