= Social Choice and Welfare =

- Discipline: social choice theory, welfare economics, game theory
- Language: English
- Edited by: Bhaskar Dutta, Marc Fleurbaey, Elizabeth Maggie Penn, Clemens Puppe

Publication details
- History: 1984-present
- Publisher: Springer Science+Business Media
- Frequency: Quarterly
- Impact factor: 0.590 (2013)

Standard abbreviations
- ISO 4: Soc. Choice Welf.

Indexing
- ISSN: 0176-1714 (print); 1432-217X (web)
- JSTOR: 01761714
- OCLC no.: 39972638

Links
- Journal homepage; Online access

Social Choice and Welfare is a quarterly peer-reviewed academic journal covering social choice and welfare economics. The journal was established in 1984 and is published by Springer Science+Business Media.

According to the Journal Citation Reports, the journal has a 2013 impact factor of 0.590.
