= Clemens Puppe =

German economist

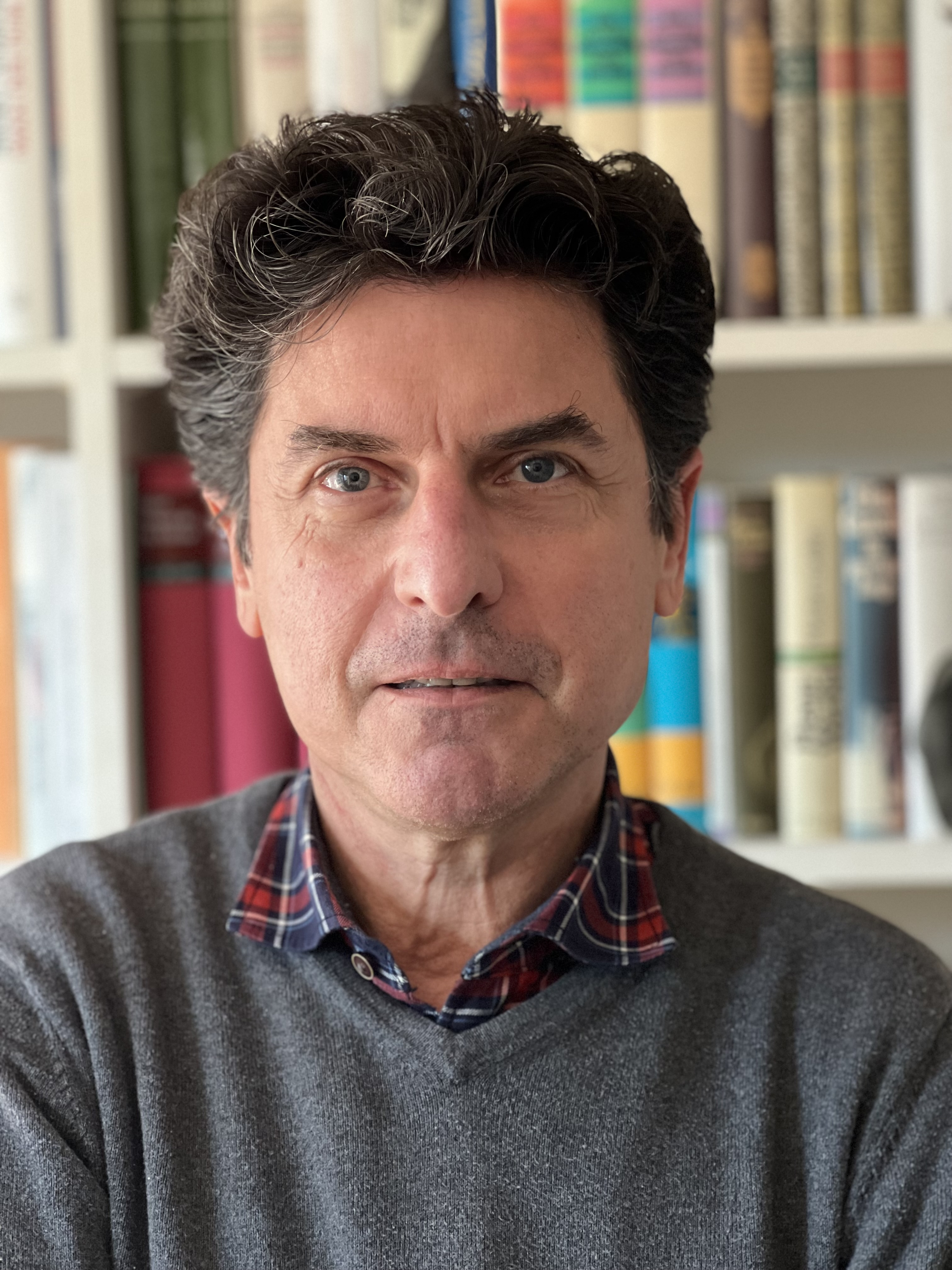
- Clemens Puppe, Heidelberg, 12 January 2022
- Born: 14 April 1960 (age 66); Heidelberg, Germany
- Education: Heidelberg University; Free University of Berlin; University of Karlsruhe
- Occupation: Professor at the Karlsruhe Institute of Technology (KIT)
- Scientific career
- Fields: Microeconomics; Decision theory Social choice theory
- Doctoral advisor: Rudolf Henn; Wolfgang Eichhorn
- Website: https://micro.econ.kit.edu/english/puppe.php

Clemens Dieter Puppe (born 14 April 1960 in Heidelberg) is a German economist. He is known for his contributions to individual and collective decision theory (social choice theory).

Clemens Puppe is professor at Karlsruhe Institute of Technology (KIT) and co-director of the Institute of Economics (ECON).

== Life and academic career ==
Clemens Puppe was born on April 14, 1960, in Heidelberg, Germany. After having abandoned the plan to study music, he began his studies in Mathematics and Philosophy at the University of Heidelberg. In the year 1983 he moved to the Free University of Berlin where he completed his M.A. studies in the year 1987 with highest distinction. From 1987 to 1991 he worked as an academic assistant at the Institute of Statistics and Mathematical Economics of the University of Karlsruhe where he finished his Ph.D. in the year 1990 with a thesis on individual decision theory under risk.

From 1991 to 1993 Clemens Puppe held a scholarship of the German Research Foundation (DFG). He spent the academic year 1991–92 as Post-Doctoral Fellow at Harvard University (Cambridge, MA). A key encounter for his future academic career was with Amartya Sen who introduced him to the problem of the measurement of freedom.

After his return to Europe, Clemens Puppe worked from 1993 to 1997 as assistant professor at the Fakultät für Wirtschaftswissenschaften der Universität Wien of the University of Vienna, where he submitted his `Habilitation´ in the year 1997.

From 1997 to 2003 Clemens Puppe was Associate Professor at the University of Bonn. In the year 2003 he joined the Karlsruhe Institute of Technology, the successor institution of the University of Karlsruhe, as Professor of Economic Theory.

From 2004 to 2008 and again from 2014 to 2016 Clemens Puppe was Vice Dean, and from 2008 to 2012 Dean of the Department of Economics and Management. From 2018 to 2022 Clemens Puppe was a member of the Senate of KIT.

== Research contributions, academic service and prizes ==
Clemens Puppe‘s research contributions are in the area of microeconomic decision theory. Following articles on the measurement of freedom of choice Clemens Puppe published in collaboration with Klaus Nehring papers on diversity theory, judgement aggregation and non-manipulable voting rules, among others. He also worked in the area personnel economics in collaboration with Michel Maréchal und Sebastian Kube.

Clemens Puppe ist Co-Editor of the Handbook of Rational and Social Choice for Oxford University Press and Editor-in-chief of the journal Social Choice and Welfare for Springer Nature. He has been awarded `Figdor-Prize´ of the Austrian Academy of Sciences (1996) and the Distinguished Visitor Awards of the University of Auckland (2013). From 2020 to 2023 he was `Leading International Researcher´ of Higher School of Economics, Campus Perm (Russian Federation). In the academic year 2021/22 he visited Oxford University as „Oliver Smithies Fellow" at Balliol College.

== Family ==
Clemens Puppe comes from an academic family. His father was the German mathematician Dieter Puppe; his uncle, Volker Puppe, is also mathematician; his aunt is the professor of law Ingeborg Puppe. An ancestor from the maternal lineage is the conductor Arthur Nikisch.

Clemens Puppe has five children and lives with his wife Irina in Heidelberg.
