= Marc Fleurbaey =

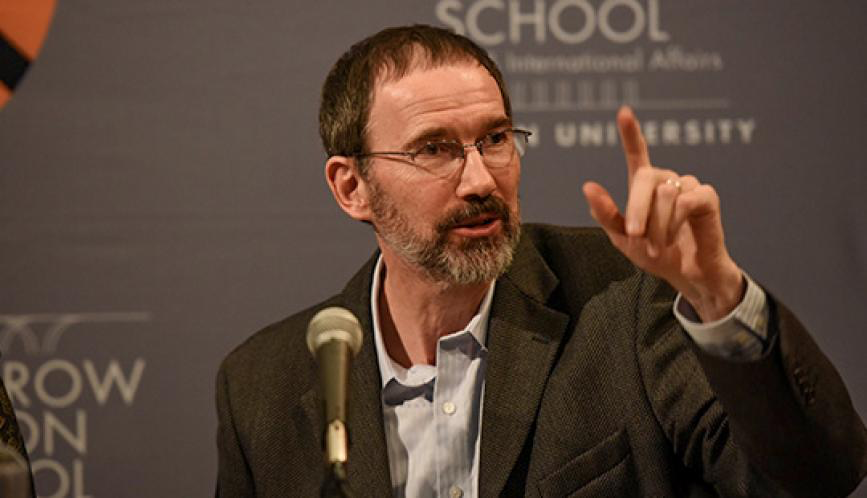
- Born: October 11, 1961 (age 65); Mesnil-Raoul, Normandy, France
- Education: ENSAE; EHESS; Université Paris-Nanterre

Marc Fleurbaey (born 11 October 1961) is a French researcher specialized in normative economics and social choice theory. He has been researcher and professor in the United Kingdom, France and the United States since 1994. He is currently professor at the Paris School of Economics.

== Education ==
Fleurbaey graduated from the ENSAE ParisTech (ENSAE) and holds a PhD in Economics under the supervision of Philippe Mongin from the French School for Advanced Studies in the Social Sciences (EHESS).

== Career ==
Fleurbaey is a member of the French National Centre for Scientific Research. From 2011 to 2020, he was Robert E. Kuenne Professor of Economics and Humanistic Studies and Professor of Public Affairs at the Woodrow Wilson School of Public and International Affairs, Princeton University. Since 2020 he has been professor at the Paris School of Economics.

Fleurbaey has been editor-in-chief for Economics & Philosophy. He is currently the editor-in-chief for Social Choice and Welfare, two journals for political philosophy and philosophy of economics.

== Public engagement ==
Fleurbaey has occupied counseling positions at the World Bank, the UN, and the OECD and has participated in different international reports on societal topics such as welfare, social progress, and climate change. Fleurbaey publishes regularly in French-speaking and English-speaking media: Huffington Post (fr), Huffington Post (en), Le Monde, Libération, La vie des idées, La Croix, Project Syndicate, The Conversation (fr), The Conversation (en), The American Prospect, LSE US Centre’s daily blog on American Politics and Policy, and the World Economic Forum. Ahead of the 2012 French presidential election, Fleurbaey co-signed an appeal of several economists in support of candidate François Hollande.

== Awards and honours ==
- 2016: Docteur honoris causa Louvain Catholic University

== Bibliography ==
Fleurbaey has authored or co-authored several books and journal articles. Among them we can cite the following books:

- Marc Fleurbaey et al., Un manifeste pour le progrès social, La Découverte, 2018; ISBN 2348041758
- Marc Fleurbaey, Matthew Adler, The Oxford Handbook of Well-Being and Public Policy, Oxford University Press, 2016; ISBN 9780199325818
- Marc Fleurbaey, Didier Blanchet, Beyond GDP: Measuring Welfare and Assessing Sustainability, Oxford University Press, 2013; ISBN 9780199767199

== See also ==
- Social choice theory
