= Philippe Mongin =

French economist (1950–2020)

- Born: 18 July 1950; Marseille, France
- Died: 5 August 2020 (aged 70); Paris, France
- Occupation: Economist

Philippe Mongin (18 July 1950 – 5 August 2020) was a French economic philosopher. He served as Director of the French National Centre for Scientific Research and was a professor at the HEC Paris. From 2006 to 2012, he was a member of the Economic Analysis Council under the Prime Minister of France.

== Biography ==
In 1969, Mongin enrolled in the École normale supérieure, where he studied literature and philosophy. He was also a student at Sciences Po, where he earned a degree in 1971. He defended his thesis under the supervision of Raymond Aron. It was the first French thesis on the Das Kapital manuscripts of Karl Marx.

Following a research visit at Cambridge University in 1975–1978, Mongin began researching contemporary and mathematical economics. In 1980, he participated in collaborative efforts by Herbert A. Simon to conduct research on concepts of rationality in neoclassical economics. Beginning in the 1990s, Mongin participated in a movement in attempt to reform normative economics and lift limits on the global market. In doing so, he developed an impossibility theorem commonly used today in economic literature. Building off of ideals from John Harsanyi on utilitarianism, he clarified his economic beliefs in response to criticisms of his mentor, Amartya Sen.

Mongin's research program on normative economics started at the Université catholique de Louvain, where he was a visiting professor from 1991 to 1996 and where he collaborates with Claude d'Aspremont. At the same time, he aimed to develop a form of logic for game theory. After his time in Belgium, he worked in the THEMA laboratory at Cergy-Pontoise University near Paris, where he met Marc Fleurbaey and Jean-François Laslier. From 1995 to 2002, he directed with Laslier the seminar "Les Midis d'Economie et Philosophie" in Paris. He directed Marc Fleurbaey's thesis in Sociology.

At the start of the 2000s, Mongin concluded much of his research and began applying his economic theories to politics and the judiciary. This led to his specialization in the judgment aggregation theory.

Philippe Mongin died on 5 August 2020 at the age of 70.
