= Average voting rule =

Voting system for participatory budgeting

The average voting rule is a rule for group decision-making when the decision is a distribution (e.g. the allocation of a budget among different issues), and each of the voters reports his ideal distribution. This is a special case of budget-proposal aggregation. It is a simple aggregation rule, that returns the arithmetic mean of all individual ideal distributions. The average rule was first studied formally by Michael Intrilligator. This rule and its variants are commonly used in economics and sports.

== Characterization ==
Intrilligator proved that the average rule is the unique rule that satisfies the following three axioms:

- Completeness: for every n distributions, the rule returns a distribution.
- Unanimity for losers: if an issue receives 0 in all individual distributions, then it receives 0 in the collective distribution.
- Strict and equal sensitivity to individual allocations: if one voter increases his allocation to one issue while all other allocations remain the same, then the collective allocation to this issue strictly increases; moreover, the rate of increase is the same for all voters (that is, it depends only on the issue).

Elkind, Greger, Lederer, Suksompong and Teh present two other characterizations of the average rule under the assumption that agent's utilities are based on L1 distance. They also show that the average rule is fairer than all other rules they considered.

== Manipulation ==
An important disadvantage of the average rule is that it is not strategyproof – it is easy to manipulate. For example, suppose there are two issues, the ideal distribution of Alice is (80%, 20%), and the average of the ideal distributions of the other voters is (60%, 40%). Then Alice would be better off if she reports that her ideal distribution is (100%, 0%), since this will pull the average distribution closer to her ideal distribution.

If all voters try to manipulate simultaneously, the computed average may be substantially different from the "real" average: in a two-issue setting with true average close to (50%, 50%), the computed average may vary by up to 20 percentage points when there are many voters, and the effect can be more extreme when the true average is more lopsided.

== Variants ==
The weighted average rule gives different weights to different voters (for example, based on their level of expertise).

The trimmed average rule discards some of the extreme bids, and returns the average of the remaining bids.

Renault and Trannoy study the combined use of the average rule and the majority rule, and their effect on minority protection.

== Other rules ==
Rosar compares the average voting rule to the median voting rule, when the voters have diverse private information and interdependent preferences. For uniformly distributed information, the average report dominates the median report from a utilitarian perspective, when the set of admissible reports is designed optimally. For general distributions, the results still hold when there are many agents.
