= Probabilistic voting model =

The probabilistic voting theory, also known as the probabilistic voting model, is a voting theory developed by professors Assar Lindbeck and Jörgen Weibull in the article "Balanced-budget redistribution as the outcome of political competition", published in 1987 in the journal Public Choice.

The probabilistic voting model assumes that voters are imperfectly informed about candidates and their platforms. Candidates are also imperfectly informed about the utility preferences of the electorate and the distribution of voters' preferences.

Unlike the median voter theorem, what drives the equilibrium policy is both the numerosity and density of social groups, rather than the median position of voters on a preference scale. The model helps explain why social groups with more homogenous preferences hold more political influence than those whose preferences are dispersed.

== Motivation and Applications ==
Political economy and public economics are the main fields in which the probabilistic voting theory is applied. In particular, it has been used to explain government spending (Persson & Tabellini, 2000; Hassler, Krusell, Storesletten & Zilibotti, 2005), public debt dynamics (Song, Storesletten & Zilibotti, 2012), effect of mass media (Strömberg, 2004) social security systems (Profeta, 2002; Gonzalez Eiras & Niepelt, 2008) and taxation (Hettich & Winer, 2005; Canegrati, 2007).

Raphael Boleslavsky and Christopher Cotton (2015) show how the underlying uncertainty that candidates have about the preferences of voters may be the result of information revelation during campaigns, with more informative campaigns leading to greater ex ante uncertainty about election-day preferences. This in turn can increase policy divergence.
