= Preference relation =

The term preference relation is used to refer to orderings that describe human preferences for one thing over an other.

- In mathematics, preferences may be modeled as a weak ordering or a semiorder, two different types of binary relation. One specific variation of weak ordering, a total preorder (= a connected, reflexive and transitive relation), is also sometimes called a preference relation.
- In computer science, machine learning algorithms are used to infer preferences, and the binary representation of the output of a preference learning algorithm is called a preference relation, regardless of whether it fits the weak ordering or semiorder mathematical models.
- Preference relations are also widely used in economics; see preference (economics).
