= Arrow–Debreu exchange market =

In theoretical economics, an Arrow–Debreu exchange market is a special case of the Arrow–Debreu model in which there is no production - there is only an exchange of already-existing goods. An Arrow–Debreu exchange market has the following ingredients:

- A set of $m$ divisible products.
- A set of $n$ agents.
- Each agent $i=1,\dots,n$, has an endowment $e_i$, which is a set of products.

Each product $j$ has a price $p_j$; the prices are determined by methods described below. The price of a bundle of products is the sum of the prices of the products in the bundle. A bundle is represented by a vector $x = x_1,\dots,x_m$, where $x_j$ is the quantity of product $j$. So the price of a bundle $x$ is $p\cdot x =\sum_{j=1}^m p_j\cdot x_j$.

Given a price-vector, the budget of an agent is the total price of his endowment, $p\cdot e_i$.

A bundle is affordable for a buyer if the price of that bundle is at most the buyer's budget. I.e, a bundle $x$ is affordable for buyer $i$ if $p\cdot x\leq p\cdot e_i$.

Each buyer has a preference relation over bundles, which can be represented by a utility function. The utility function of buyer $i$ is denoted by $u_i$. The demand set of a buyer is the set of affordable bundles that maximize the buyer's utility among all affordable bundles, i.e.:

$\text{Demand}_i(p) := \arg\max_{p\cdot x\leq p\cdot e_i} u_i(x)$.

A competitive equilibrium (CE) is a price-vector $p_1,\dots,p_m$in which it is possible to allocate, to each agent, a bundle from his demand-set, such that the total allocation exactly equals the supply of products. The corresponding prices are called market-clearing prices. A CE always exists, even in the more general Arrow–Debreu model. The main challenge is to find a CE.

== Computing an equilibrium ==
=== Approximate CE ===
Kakade, Kearns and Ortiz gave algorithms for approximate CE in a generalized Arrow-Debreu market in which agents are located on a graph and trade may occur only between neighboring agents. They considered non-linear utilities.

=== Exact CE ===
Jain presented the first polynomial-time algorithm for computing an exact CE when all agents have linear utilities. His algorithm is based on solving a convex program using the ellipsoid method and simultaneous diophantine approximation. He also proved that the set of assignments at equilibrium is convex, and the equilibrium prices themselves are log-convex.

Based on Jain's algorithm, Ye developed a more practical interior-point method for finding a CE.

Devanur and Kannan gave algorithms for exchange markets with concave utility functions, where all resources are goods (the utilities are positive):

- When the utilities are SPLC (Separable Piecewise-Linear Concave) and either n or m is a constant, their algorithm is polynomial in the other parameter. The technique is decomposing the space of possible prices into cells using a constant number of hyperplanes, so that in each cell, each buyer’s threshold marginal utility is known. When both n and m are variable, it was left open whether a polytime algorithm exists. Later, Chen, Dai, Du and Teng proved that, with SPLC utilities, computing a CE is PPAD-hard. Their proof shows also that this market-equilibrium problem does not have an FPTAS unless PPAD is contained in P.
- When the utilities are PLC (Piecewise-Linear Concave, but not necessarily separable) and m is constant, their algorithm is polynomial in n. But when both m and n are variable, finding a CE is PPAD-hard even for Leontief utilities, which are a special case of PLC utilities (when n is constant but m is variable, it was left open whether a polytime algorithm exists).

Codenotti, McCune, Penumatcha and Varadarajan gave an algorithm for Arrow-Debreu markes with CES utilities where the elasticity of substitution is at least 1/2.

Chaudhury, Garg, McGlaughlin and Mehta prove that, when the products are bads, computing an equilibrium is PPAD-hard even when utilities are linear, and even under a certain condition that guarantees CE existence.

=== CE for markets with production ===
Newman and Primak studied two variants of the ellipsoid method for finding an approximate CE in an Arrow-Debreu market with production, when all agents have linear utilities. They proved that the inscribed ellipsoid method is more computationally efficient than the circumscribed ellipsoid method.

== Related models ==
A Fisher market is a simpler market in which agents are only buyers - not sellers. Each agent comes with a pre-specified budget, and can use it to buy goods at the given price.

In a Fisher market, increasing prices always decreases the agents' demand, as they can buy less with their fixed budget. However, in an Arrow-Debreu exchange market, increasing prices also increases the agents' budgets, which means that the demand is not a monotone function of the prices. This makes computing a CE in an Arrow-Debreu exchange market much more challenging.
