= Arrow–Debreu market =

The term Arrow-Debreu market can refer to two closely related economic models:

- Arrow–Debreu model - a general market model, in which there are households (that can be both buyers and sellers) and producers.
- Arrow–Debreu exchange market - a special case in which there are only households - no producers.
