= Kousha Etessami =

Professor

Kousha Etessami is a professor of computer science at the University of Edinburgh, Scotland, UK. He has received his Ph.D. from the University of Massachusetts Amherst in 1995. He works on theoretical computer science, in particular on computational complexity theory, game theory and probabilistic systems.

Etessami is one of the inventors of the complexity class FIXP.
