= Fixed-point computation =

Computing the fixed point of a function

Fixed-point computation refers to the process of computing an exact or approximate fixed point of a given function. In its most common form, the given function $f$ satisfies the condition to the Brouwer fixed-point theorem: that is, $f$ is continuous and maps the unit d-cube to itself. The Brouwer fixed-point theorem guarantees that $f$ has a fixed point, but the proof is not constructive. Various algorithms have been devised for computing an approximate fixed point. Such algorithms are used in various tasks, such as

- Nash equilibrium computation,
- Market equilibrium computation,
- Dynamic system analysis.

== Definitions ==
The graph of an example function with three fixed points

The unit interval is denoted by $E := [0, 1]$, and the unit d-dimensional cube is denoted by $E^d$. A continuous function $f$ is defined on $E^d$ (from $E^d$ to itself). Often, it is assumed that $f$ is not only continuous but also Lipschitz continuous, that is, for some constant $L$, $|f(x)-f(y)| \leq L\cdot |x-y|$ for all $x,y$ in $E^d$.

A fixed point of $f$ is a point $x$ in $E^d$ such that $f(x) = x$. By the Brouwer fixed-point theorem, any continuous function from $E^d$ to itself has a fixed point. But for general functions, it is impossible to compute a fixed point precisely, since it can be an arbitrary real number. Fixed-point computation algorithms look for approximate fixed points. There are several criteria for an approximate fixed point. Several common criteria are:

- The residual criterion: given an approximation parameter $\varepsilon>0$ , An ε-residual fixed-point of $f$ is a point $x$ in $E^d$' such that $|f(x)-x|\leq \varepsilon$, where here $|\cdot|$ denotes the maximum norm. That is, all $d$ coordinates of the difference $f(x)-x$ should be at most ε.
- The absolute criterion: given an approximation parameter $\delta>0$, A δ-absolute fixed-point of $f$ is a point $x$ in $E^d$ such that $|x-x_0| \leq \delta$, where $x_0$ is any fixed-point of $f$.
- The relative criterion: given an approximation parameter $\delta>0$, A δ-relative fixed-point of $f$ is a point x in $E^d$ such that $|x-x_0|/|x_0|\leq \delta$, where $x_0$ is any fixed-point of $f$.

For Lipschitz-continuous functions, the absolute criterion is stronger than the residual criterion: If $f$ is Lipschitz-continuous with constant $L$, then $|x-x_0|\leq \delta$ implies $|f(x)-f(x_0)|\leq L\cdot \delta$. Since $x_0$ is a fixed-point of $f$, this implies $|f(x)-x_0|\leq L\cdot \delta$, so $|f(x)-x|\leq (1+L)\cdot \delta$. Therefore, a δ-absolute fixed-point is also an ε-residual fixed-point with $\varepsilon = (1+L)\cdot \delta$.

The most basic step of a fixed-point computation algorithm is a value query: given any $x$ in $E^d$, the algorithm is provided with an oracle $\tilde{f}$ to $f$ that returns the value $f(x)$. The accuracy of the approximate fixed-point depends upon the error in the oracle $\tilde{f}(x)$.

The function $f$ is accessible via evaluation queries: for any $x$, the algorithm can evaluate $f(x)$. The run-time complexity of an algorithm is usually given by the number of required evaluations.

== Contractive functions ==
A Lipschitz-continuous function with constant $L$ is called contractive if $L<1$; it is called weakly-contractive if $L\le 1$. Every contractive function satisfying Brouwer's conditions has a unique fixed point. Moreover, fixed-point computation for contractive functions is easier than for general functions.

Computing a fixed point using function iteration

The first algorithm for fixed-point computation was the fixed-point iteration algorithm of Banach. Banach's fixed-point theorem implies that, when fixed-point iteration is applied to a contraction mapping, the error after $t$ iterations is in $O(L^t)$. Therefore, the number of evaluations required for a $\delta$-relative fixed-point is approximately $\log_L(\delta) = \log(\delta)/\log(L) = \log(1/\delta)/\log(1/L)$. Sikorski and Wozniakowski showed that Banach's algorithm is optimal when the dimension is large. Specifically, when $d\geq \log(1/\delta)/\log(1/L)$, the number of required evaluations of any algorithm for $\delta$-relative fixed-point is larger than 50% the number of evaluations required by the iteration algorithm. Note that when $L$ approaches 1, the number of evaluations approaches infinity. No finite algorithm can compute a $\delta$-absolute fixed point for all functions with $L=1$.

When $L$ < 1 and d = 1, the optimal algorithm is the Fixed Point Envelope (FPE) algorithm of Sikorski and Wozniakowski. It finds a δ-relative fixed point using $O(\log(1/\delta) + \log \log(1/(1-L)))$ queries, and a δ-absolute fixed point using $O(\log(1/\delta))$ queries. This is faster than the fixed-point iteration algorithm.

When $d>1$ but not too large, and $L\le 1$, the optimal algorithm is the interior-ellipsoid algorithm (based on the ellipsoid method). It finds an ε-residual fixed-point using $O(d\cdot \log(1/\varepsilon))$ evaluations. When $L<1$, it finds a $\delta$-absolute fixed point using $O(d\cdot [\log(1/\delta) + \log(1/(1-L))])$ evaluations.

Shellman and Sikorski presented an algorithm called BEFix (Bisection Envelope Fixed-point) for computing an ε-residual fixed-point of a two-dimensional function with '$L\le 1$, using only $2 \lceil\log_2(1/\varepsilon)\rceil+1$ queries. They later presented an improvement called BEDFix (Bisection Envelope Deep-cut Fixed-point), with the same worst-case guarantee but better empirical performance. When $L<1$, BEDFix can also compute a $\delta$-absolute fixed-point using $O(\log(1/\varepsilon)+\log(1/(1-L)))$ queries.

Shellman and Sikorski presented an algorithm called PFix for computing an ε-residual fixed-point of a d-dimensional function with L ≤ 1, using $O(\log^d(1/\varepsilon))$ queries. When $L$ < 1, PFix can be executed with $\varepsilon = (1-L)\cdot \delta$, and in that case, it computes a δ-absolute fixed-point, using $O(\log^d(1/[(1-L)\delta]))$ queries. It is more efficient than the iteration algorithm when $L$ is close to 1. The algorithm is recursive: it handles a d-dimensional function by recursive calls on (d-1)-dimensional functions.

=== Algorithms for differentiable functions ===
When the function $f$ is differentiable, and the algorithm can evaluate its derivative (not only $f$ itself), the Newton method can be used and it is much faster.

== General functions: one dimension ==
For functions with Lipschitz constant $L$ > 1, computing a fixed-point is much harder.

For a 1-dimensional function (d = 1), a $\delta$-absolute fixed-point can be found using $O(\log(1/\delta))$ queries using the bisection method: start with the interval $E := [0, 1]$; at each iteration, let $x$ be the center of the current interval, and compute $f(x)$; if $f(x) > x$ then recurse on the sub-interval to the right of $x$; otherwise, recurse on the interval to the left of $x$. Note that the current interval always contains a fixed point, so after $O(\log(1/\delta))$ queries, any point in the remaining interval is a $\delta$-absolute fixed-point of $f$ Setting $\delta := \varepsilon/(L+1)$, where $L$ is the Lipschitz constant, gives an ε-residual fixed-point, using $O(\log(L/\varepsilon) = \log(L) + \log(1/\varepsilon))$ queries.

== General functions: two or more dimensions ==
For functions in two or more dimensions, the problem is much more challenging. Shellman and Sikorski proved that for any integers d ≥ 2 and $L$ > 1, finding a δ-absolute fixed-point of d-dimensional $L$-Lipschitz functions might require infinitely many evaluations. The proof idea is as follows. For any integer T > 1 and any sequence of T of evaluation queries (possibly adaptive), one can construct two functions that are Lipschitz-continuous with constant $L$, and yield the same answer to all these queries, but one of them has a unique fixed-point at (x, 0) and the other has a unique fixed-point at (x, 1). Any algorithm using T evaluations cannot differentiate between these functions, so cannot find a δ-absolute fixed-point. This is true for any finite integer T.

Several algorithms based on function evaluations have been developed for finding an ε-residual fixed-point.

=== Simplicial method ===
The first algorithm to approximate a fixed point of a general function was developed by Herbert Scarf in 1967. Scarf's algorithm finds an ε-residual fixed-point by finding a fully labeled "primitive set", in a construction similar to Sperner's lemma.

A later algorithm by Harold Kuhn used simplices and simplicial partitions instead of primitive sets.

Developing the simplicial approach further, Orin Harrison Merrill presented the restart algorithm.

=== Homotopy method ===
B. Curtis Eaves presented the homotopy method, based on the concept of homotopy.

Given a function f, for which we want to find a fixed point, the algorithm works by starting with an affine function that approximates f, and deforming it towards f while following the fixed point.

The homotopy method has been used for market equilibrium computation.

The method is further explained in a book by Michael Todd, which surveys various algorithms developed until 1976.

=== Other algorithms ===
- David Gale showed that computing a fixed point of an n-dimensional function (on the unit d-dimensional cube) is equivalent to deciding who is the winner in a d-dimensional game of Hex (a game with d players, each of whom needs to connect two opposite faces of a d-cube). Given the desired accuracy ε
  - Construct a Hex board of size kd, where $k > 1/\varepsilon$. Each vertex z corresponds to a point z/k in the unit n-cube.
  - Compute the difference $f$(z/k) - z/k; note that the difference is an n-vector.
  - Label the vertex z by a label in 1, ..., d, denoting the largest coordinate in the difference vector.
  - The resulting labeling corresponds to a possible play of the d-dimensional Hex game among d players. This game must have a winner, and Gale presents an algorithm for constructing the winning path.
  - In the winning path, there must be a point in which f_{i}(z/k) - z/k is positive, and an adjacent point in which f_{i}(z/k) - z/k is negative. This means that there is a fixed point of $f$ between these two points.

In the worst case, the number of function evaluations required by all these algorithms is exponential in the binary representation of the accuracy, that is, in $\Omega(1/\varepsilon)$.

==== Query complexity ====
Hirsch, Papadimitriou and Vavasis proved that any algorithm based on function evaluations, that finds an ε-residual fixed-point of f, requires $\Omega(L'/\varepsilon)$ function evaluations, where $L'$ is the Lipschitz constant of the function $f(x)-x$ (note that $L-1 \leq L' \leq L+1$). More precisely:

- For a 2-dimensional function (d=2), they prove a tight bound $\Theta(L'/\varepsilon)$.
- For any d ≥ 3, finding an ε-residual fixed-point of a d-dimensional function requires $\Omega((L'/\varepsilon)^{d-2})$ queries and $O((L'/\varepsilon)^{d})$ queries.

The latter result leaves a gap in the exponent. Chen and Deng closed the gap. They proved that, for any d ≥ 2 and $1/\varepsilon > 4 d$ and $L'/\varepsilon > 192 d^3$, the number of queries required for computing an ε-residual fixed-point is in $\Theta((L'/\varepsilon)^{d-1})$.

== Discrete fixed-point computation ==
A discrete function is a function defined on a subset of $\mathbb{Z}^d$ (the d-dimensional integer grid). There are several discrete fixed-point theorems, stating conditions under which a discrete function has a fixed point. For example, the Iimura-Murota-Tamura theorem states that (in particular) if $f$ is a function from a rectangle subset of $\mathbb{Z}^d$ to itself, and $f$ is hypercubic direction-preserving, then $f$ has a fixed point.

Let $f$ be a direction-preserving function from the integer cube $\{1, \dots, n\}^d$ to itself. Chen and Deng prove that, for any d ≥ 2 and n > 48d, computing such a fixed point requires $\Theta(n^{d-1})$ function evaluations.

Chen and Deng define a different discrete-fixed-point problem, which they call 2D-BROUWER. It considers a discrete function $f$ on $\{0,\dots, n\}^2$ such that, for every x on the grid, $f$(x) - x is either (0, 1) or (1, 0) or (-1, -1). The goal is to find a square in the grid, in which all three labels occur. The function $f$ must map the square $\{0,\dots, n\}^2$to itself, so it must map the lines x = 0 and y = 0 to either (0, 1) or (1, 0); the line x = n to either (-1, -1) or (0, 1); and the line y = n to either (-1, -1) or (1,0). The problem can be reduced to 2D-SPERNER (computing a fully-labeled triangle in a triangulation satisfying the conditions to Sperner's lemma), and therefore it is PPAD-complete. This implies that computing an approximate fixed-point is PPAD-complete even for very simple functions.

== Relation between fixed-point computation and root-finding algorithms ==
Given a function $g$ from $E^d$ to R, a root of $g$ is a point x in $E^d$ such that $g$(x)=0. An ε-root of g is a point x in $E^d$ such that $g(x)\leq \varepsilon$.

Fixed-point computation is a special case of root-finding: given a function $f$ on $E^d$, define $g(x) := |f(x)-x|$. X is a fixed-point of $f$ if and only if x is a root of $g$, and x is an ε-residual fixed-point of $f$ if and only if x is an ε-root of $g$. Therefore, any root-finding algorithm (an algorithm that computes an approximate root of a function) can be used to find an approximate fixed-point.

The opposite is not true: finding an approximate root of a general function may be harder than finding an approximate fixed point. In particular, Sikorski proved that finding an ε-root requires $\Omega(1/\varepsilon^d)$ function evaluations. This gives an exponential lower bound even for a one-dimensional function (in contrast, an ε-residual fixed-point of a one-dimensional function can be found using $O(\log(1/\varepsilon))$ queries using the bisection method). Here is a proof sketch. Construct a function $g$ that is slightly larger than ε everywhere in $E^d$ except in some small cube around some point x_{0}, where x_{0} is the unique root of $g$. If $g$ is Lipschitz continuous with constant $L$, then the cube around x_{0} can have a side-length of $\varepsilon/L$. Any algorithm that finds an ε-root of $g$ must check a set of cubes that covers the entire $E^d$; the number of such cubes is at least $(L/\varepsilon)^d$.

However, there are classes of functions for which finding an approximate root is equivalent to finding an approximate fixed point. One example is the class of functions $g$ such that $g(x)+x$ maps $E^d$ to itself (that is: $g(x)+x$ is in $E^d$ for all x in $E^d$). This is because, for every such function, the function $f(x) := g(x)+x$ satisfies the conditions of Brouwer's fixed-point theorem. X is a fixed-point of $f$ if and only if x is a root of $g$, and x is an ε-residual fixed-point of $f$ if and only if x is an ε-root of $g$. Chen and Deng show that the discrete variants of these problems are computationally equivalent: both problems require $\Theta(n^{d-1})$ function evaluations.

== Communication complexity ==
Roughgarden and Weinstein studied the communication complexity of computing an approximate fixed-point. In their model, there are two agents: one of them knows a function $f$ and the other knows a function $g$. Both functions are Lipschitz continuous and satisfy Brouwer's conditions. The goal is to compute an approximate fixed point of the composite function $g\circ f$. They show that the deterministic communication complexity is in $\Omega(2^d)$.
