= Edgeworth's limit theorem =

Mathematical theorem

Edgeworth's limit theorem is an economic theorem, named after Francis Ysidro Edgeworth, stating that the core of an economy shrinks to the set of Walrasian equilibria as the number of agents increases to infinity.

That is, among all possible outcomes which may result from free market exchange or barter between groups of people, while the precise location of the final settlement (the ultimate division of goods) between the parties is not uniquely determined, as the number of traders increases, the set of all possible final settlements converges to the set of Walrasian equilibria.

Intuitively, it may be interpreted as stating that as an economy grows larger, agents increasingly behave as if they are price-taking agents, even if they have the power to bargain.

Edgeworth (1881) conjectured the theorem, and provided most of the necessary intuition and went some way towards its proof. Formal proofs were presented under different assumptions by Debreu and Scarf (1963) as well as Aumann (1964), both proved under conditions stricter than what Edgeworth conjectured. Debreu and Scarf considered the case of a "replica economy" where there is a finite number of agent types and the agents added to the economy to make it "large" are of the same type and in the same proportion as those already in it. Aumann's result relied on an existence of a continuum of agents.

== The core of an economy ==
The core of an economy is a concept from cooperative game theory defined as the set of feasible allocations in an economy that cannot be improved upon by subset of the set of the economy's consumers (a coalition). For general equilibrium economies typically the core is non-empty (there is at least one feasible allocation) but also "large" in the sense that there may be a continuum of feasible allocations that satisfy the requirements. The conjecture basically states that if the number of agents is also "large" then the only allocations in the core are precisely what a competitive market would produce. As such, the conjecture is seen as providing some game-theoretic foundations for the usual assumption in general equilibrium theory of price taking agents. In particular, it means that in a "large" economy people act as if they were price takers, even though theoretically they have all the power to set prices and renegotiate their trades. Hence, the fictitious Walrasian auctioneer of general equilibrium, while strictly speaking completely unrealistic, can be seen as a "short-cut" to getting the right answer.

== Illustration when there are only two commodities ==
Francis Ysidro Edgeworth first described what later became known as the limit theorem in his book Mathematical Psychics (1881). He used a variant of what is now known as the Edgeworth box (with quantities traded, rather than quantities possessed, on the relevant axes) to analyse trade between groups of traders of various sizes. In general he found that 'Contract without competition is indeterminate, contract with perfect competition is perfectly determinate, [and] contract with more or less perfect competition is less or more indeterminate.'

=== Trade without competition ===
Figure 1 - An Edgeworth box showing exchange between two people.

If trade in two goods, X and Y, occurs between a single pair of traders, A and B, the potential outcomes of this trade can be shown in an Edgeworth box (Figure 1). In this diagram A and B initially possess the entire stock of X and Y respectively (point E). The lines U(a) and U(b) are the indifference curves of A and B which run through points representing combinations of goods which give utility equal to their initial holdings. As trade here is assumed to be non-coercive, neither of the traders will agree to a final settlement which leaves them worse off than they started off and thus U(a) and U(b) represent the outer boundaries of possible settlements. Edgeworth demonstrated that traders will ultimately reach a point on the contract curve (between C and C') through a stylized bargaining process which is termed the recontracting process. As neither person can be made better off without the other being made worse off at points on the contract curve, once the traders agree to settle at a point on it, this is a final settlement. Exactly where the final settlement will be on the contract curve cannot be determined. It will depend on the bargaining process between the two people; the party who is able to obtain an advantage while bargaining will be able to obtain a better price for his or her goods and thus receive the higher gains from trade.

This was Edgeworth's key finding - the result of trade between two people can be predicted within a certain range but the exact outcome is indeterminate.

=== Trade with less than perfect competition ===
Figure 2 - Trade between two pairs of people.

Figure 3 - The new limits of the contract curve.

Suppose a single extra pair of identical traders is added to this initial pair. As these new traders are identical to the first pair, the same Edgeworth box can be used to analyse the exchange. To examine the new outer limits of the trade, Edgeworth considered the situation where trade occurs at the limit of trade between two people (point C or C' in Figure 2). If trade were to occur at point C one of the B's (say B(1)) would receive all the gains from trade. The one A who trades with B(1) (say A(1)) now has a mix of goods X and Y which he is able to trade with A(2). As the two A's are identical, they will agree to split their post-trade endowments equally between them, placing them at point P in Figure 2 which gives them a higher utility than they would otherwise receive (indifference curve U'(a) instead of U(a)). B(2) now has an opportunity and strong incentive to offer the A's a better price for their goods and trade with them at this price, leaving B(1) out in the cold. This process of B's competing against one another to offer the A's a better price will continue until the A's are indifferent between trading at P and trading on the contract curve (Figure 3). The same reasoning can be applied to the case where A(1) initially receives all the gains from trade, and it can be shown that the outermost limit given by U(b) will also move inwards. This is called the shrinking core of the market - as an extra pair of traders is added, the feasible range of trades shrinks.

Figure 4 - Final settlement of trade with multiple pairs of traders.

If a third pair of traders is added, the core of the market shrinks further. If trade occurs at the limit where B(1) gets all the gains from trade, the point P is now two thirds of the way along the line EC. This improves the bargaining power of the A's who are able to get onto a higher indifference curve as B's compete to trade with them. The outer limit of final settlement where there are multiple pairs of traders can be generalised (Figure 4) where K = (n-1)/n.

=== Trade with perfect competition ===
Figure 5 - Trade with many pairs of traders.

If there is a sufficient number of traders, the core of the market will shrink such that the point of final settlement is perfectly determinate (Figure 5). This point is equal to the price-taking equilibrium at which trade is assumed to take place at in models of perfect competition.

=== Generalisation ===
This analysis can be modified to accommodate traders who are not identical or who have motivations which aren't purely selfish as well as the situation where one group of traders is larger than the other. If the traders are heterogeneous the point P will not reflect a "split the difference" trade between the group of traders and the outer limit of trade determined by this point will be modified accordingly. If the utility of one trader(s) influences the utility of another (i.e. the latter is not selfish) then the associated limit of the contract curve will shrink inwards, ruling out the most inequitable trades. If the groups of traders are differently sized, the outer limits of the contract curve will not shrink an equal amount.

== See also ==
- Cooperative bargaining
