= Arrow–Debreu model =

Economic Model

In mathematical economics, the Arrow–Debreu model is a theoretical general equilibrium model. It posits that under certain economic assumptions (convex preferences, perfect competition, and demand independence), there must be a set of prices such that aggregate supplies will equal aggregate demands for every commodity in the economy.

The model is central to the theory of general (economic) equilibrium, and it is used as a general reference for other microeconomic models. It was proposed by Kenneth Arrow, Gérard Debreu in 1954, and Lionel W. McKenzie independently in 1954, with later improvements in 1959.

The A-D model is one of the most general models of competitive economy and is a crucial part of general equilibrium theory, as it can be used to prove the existence of general equilibrium (or Walrasian equilibrium) of an economy. In general, there may be many equilibria.

Arrow (1972) and Debreu (1983) were separately awarded the Nobel Prize in Economics for their development of the model. McKenzie, however, did not receive the award.

== Formal statement ==
The contents of both theorems [fundamental theorems of welfare economics] are old beliefs in economics. Arrow and Debreu have recently treated this question with techniques permitting proofs.

— Gérard Debreu, Valuation equilibrium and Pareto optimum (1954)

This statement is precisely correct; once there were beliefs, now there was knowledge. The Arrow-Debreu model, as communicated in the Theory of Value, changed basic thinking and quickly became the standard model of price theory. It is the "benchmark" model in Finance, International Trade, Public Finance, Transportation, and even macroeconomics... In rather short order, it was no longer "as it is" in Marshall, Hicks, and Samuelson; rather, it became "as it is" in Theory of Value.

— Hugo Sonnenschein, remarks at the Debreu conference, Berkeley, 2005

This section follows the presentation in, which is based on.

=== Intuitive description of the Arrow–Debreu model ===
The Arrow–Debreu model models an economy as a combination of three kinds of agents: the households, the producers, and the market. The households and producers transact with the market but not with each other directly.

The households possess endowments (bundles of commodities they begin with), one may think of as "inheritance." For mathematical clarity, all households must sell all their endowment to the market at the beginning. If they wish to retain some of the endowments, they would have to repurchase them from the market later. The endowments may be working hours, land use, tons of corn, etc.

The households possess proportional ownerships of producers, which can be thought of as joint-stock companies. The profit made by producer $j$ is divided among the households in proportion to how much stock each household holds for the producer $j$. Ownership is imposed initially, and the households may not sell, buy, create, or discard them.

The households receive a budget, income from selling endowments, and dividend from producer profits. The households possess preferences over bundles of commodities, which, under the assumptions given, makes them utility maximizers. The households choose the consumption plan with the highest utility they can afford using their budget.

The producers can transform bundles of commodities into other bundles of commodities. The producers have no separate utility functions. Instead, they are all purely profit maximizers.

The market is only capable of "choosing" a market price vector, which is a list of prices for each commodity, which every producer and household takes (there is no bargaining behavior—every producer and household is a price taker). The market has no utility or profit. Instead, the market aims to choose a market price vector such that, even though each household and producer is maximizing their utility and profit, their consumption and production plans "harmonize." That is, "the market clears". In other words, the market is playing the role of a "Walrasian auctioneer."

How an Arrow–Debreu model moves from beginning to end.
households	producers
receive endowment and ownership of producers	
sell all endowment to the market	
	plan production to maximize profit
	enter purchase agreements between the market and each other
	perform production plan
	sell everything to the market
	send all profits to households in proportion to ownership
plan consumption to maximize utility under budget constraint	
buy the planned consumption from the market	

=== Notation setup ===
In general, we write indices of agents as superscripts and vector coordinate indices as subscripts.

==== useful notations for real vectors ====
- $x \succeq y$ if $\forall n, x_n \geq y_n$
- $\R^N_+$ is the set of $x$ such that $x \succeq 0$
- $\R_{++}^N$ is the set of $x$ such that $x \succ 0$
- $\Delta_N = \left\{x\in \R^N: x_1, ..., x_N \geq 0, \sum_{n\in 1:N} x_n = 1\right\}$ is the N-simplex. We often call it the price simplex since we sometimes scale the price vector to lie on it.

==== market ====
- The commodities are indexed as $n\in 1:N$. Here $N$ is the number of commodities in the economy. It is a finite number.
- The price vector $p = (p_1, ..., p_N) \in \R_{++}^N$ is a vector of length $N$, with each coordinate being the price of a commodity. The prices may be zero or positive.

==== households ====
- The households are indexed as $i\in I$.
- Each household begins with an endowment of commodities $r^i\in \R^N_+$.
- Each household begins with a tuple of ownerships of the producers $\alpha^{i,j} \geq 0$. The ownerships satisfy $\sum_{i\in I} \alpha^{i,j} = 1 \quad \forall j\in J$.
- The budget that the household receives is the sum of its income from selling endowments at the market price, plus profits from its ownership of producers:
  $$M^i(p) = \langle p, r^i\rangle + \sum_{j\in J}\alpha^{i,j}\Pi^j(p)$$
  ($M$ stands for money)
- Each household has a Consumption Possibility Set $\mathit{CPS}^i\subset \R_+^N$.
- Each household has a preference relation $\succeq^i$ over $\mathit{CPS}^i$.
- With assumptions on $\succeq^i$ (given in the next section), each preference relation is representable by a utility function $u^i: \mathit{CPS}^i \to [0, 1]$ by the Debreu theorems. Thus instead of maximizing preference, we can equivalently state that the household is maximizing its utility.
- A consumption plan is a vector in $\mathit{CPS}^i$, written as $x^i$.
- $U_+^i(x^i)$ is the set of consumption plans at least as preferable as $x^i$.
- The budget set is the set of consumption plans that it can afford:
  $$B^i(p) = \{x^i \in \mathit{CPS}^i : \langle p, x^i \rangle \leq M^i(p)\}$$.
- For each price vector $p$, the household has a demand vector for commodities, as $D^i(p)\in \R_+^N$. This function is defined as the solution to a constraint maximization problem. It depends on both the economy and the initial distribution.
  $$D^i(p) := \arg\max_{x^i \in B^i(p)} u^i(x^i)$$
  It may not be well-defined for all $p \in \R^N_{++}$. However, we will use enough assumptions to be well-defined at equilibrium price vectors.

==== producers ====
- The producers are indexed as $j\in J$.
- Each producer has a Production Possibility Set $\mathit{PPS}^j$. Note that the supply vector may have both positive and negative coordinates. For example, $(-1, 1, 0)$ indicates a production plan that uses up 1 unit of commodity 1 to produce 1 unit of commodity 2.
- A production plan is a vector in $\mathit{PPS}^j$, written as $y^j$.
- For each price vector $p$, the producer has a supply vector for commodities, as $S^j(p)\in \R^N$. This function will be defined as the solution to a constraint maximization problem. It depends on both the economy and the initial distribution.
  $$S^j(p) := \arg\max_{y^j\in \mathit{PPS}^j} \langle p, y^j\rangle$$
  It may not be well-defined for all $p \in \R^N_{++}$. However, we will use enough assumptions to be well-defined at equilibrium price vectors.
- The profit is
  $$\Pi^j(p) := \langle p, S^j(p)\rangle = \max_{y^j\in \mathit{PPS}^j} \langle p, y^j\rangle$$

==== aggregates ====
- aggregate consumption possibility set $\mathit{CPS} = \sum_{i\in I}\mathit{CPS}^i$.
- aggregate production possibility set $\mathit{PPS} = \sum_{j\in J}\mathit{PPS}^j$.
- aggregate endowment $r = \sum_i r^i$
- aggregate demand $D(p) := \sum_i D^i(p)$
- aggregate supply $S(p) := \sum_j S^j(p)$
- excess demand $Z(p) = D(p) - S(p) - r$

==== the whole economy ====
- An economy is a tuple $(N, I, J, \mathit{CPS}^i, \succeq^i, \mathit{PPS}^j)$. It is a tuple specifying the commodities, consumer preferences, consumption possibility sets, and producers' production possibility sets.
- An economy with initial distribution is an economy, along with an initial distribution tuple $(r^i, \alpha^{i,j})_{i\in I, j\in J}$ for the economy.
- A state of the economy is a tuple of price, consumption plans, and production plans for each household and producer: $((p_n)_{n\in 1:N}, (x^i)_{i\in I}, (y^j)_{j\in J})$.
- A state is feasible iff each $x^i \in \mathit{CPS}^i$, each $y^j\in \mathit{PPS}^j$, and $\sum_{i\in I}x^i \preceq \sum_{j\in J}y^j + r$.
- The feasible production possibilities set, given endowment $r$, is $\mathit{PPS}_r := \{y\in \mathit{PPS}: y+r \succeq 0\}$.
- Given an economy with distribution, the state corresponding to a price vector $p$ is $(p, (D^i(p))_{i\in I}, (S^j(p))_{j\in J})$.
- Given an economy with distribution, a price vector $p$ is an equilibrium price vector for the economy with initial distribution, iff
  $$Z(p)_n \begin{cases}
\leq 0 \text{ if } p_n = 0 \\
= 0 \text{ if } p_n > 0
\end{cases}$$
  That is, if a commodity is not free, then supply exactly equals demand, and if a commodity is free, then supply is equal or greater than demand (we allow free commodity to be oversupplied).
- A state is an equilibrium state iff it is the state corresponding to an equilibrium price vector.

=== Assumptions ===
on the households
assumption	explanation	can we relax it?
$\mathit{CPS}^i$ is closed	Technical assumption necessary for proofs to work.	No. It is necessary for the existence of demand functions.
local nonsatiation: $\forall x\in \mathit{CPS}^i, \epsilon > 0,$ $\exists x'\in \mathit{CPS}^i, x' \succ^i x,\|x' - x\|< \epsilon$	Households always want to consume a little more.	No. It is necessary for Walras's law to hold.
$\mathit{CPS}^i$ is strictly convex	strictly diminishing marginal utility	Yes, to mere convexity, with Kakutani's fixed-point theorem. See next section.
$\mathit{CPS}^i$ is convex	diminishing marginal utility	Yes, to nonconvexity, with Shapley–Folkman lemma.
continuity: $U_+^i(x^i)$ is closed.	Technical assumption necessary for the existence of utility functions by the Debreu theorems.	No. If the preference is not continuous, then the excess demand function may not be continuous.
$U_+^i(x^i)$ is strictly convex.	For two consumption bundles, any bundle between them is better than the lesser.	Yes, to mere convexity, with Kakutani's fixed-point theorem. See the next section.
$U_+^i(x^i)$ is convex.	For two consumption bundles, any bundle between them is no worse than the lesser.	Yes, to nonconvexity, with Shapley–Folkman lemma.
The household always has at least one feasible consumption plan.	no bankruptcy	No. It is necessary for the existence of demand functions.

on the producers
assumption	explanation	can we relax it?
$\mathit{PPS}^j$ is strictly convex	diseconomies of scale	Yes, to mere convexity, with Kakutani's fixed-point theorem. See next section.
$\mathit{PPS}^j$ is convex	no economies of scale	Yes, to nonconvexity, with Shapley–Folkman lemma.
$\mathit{PPS}^j$ contains 0.	Producers can close down for free.	
$\mathit{PPS}^j$ is a closed set	Technical assumption necessary for proofs to work.	No. It is necessary for the existence of supply functions.
$\mathit{PPS} \cap \R_+^N$ is bounded	There is no arbitrarily large "free lunch".	No. Economy needs scarcity.
$\mathit{PPS} \cap (-\mathit{PPS})$ is bounded	The economy cannot reverse arbitrarily large transformations.	

=== Imposing an artificial restriction ===
The functions $D^i(p), S^j(p)$ are not necessarily well-defined for all price vectors $p$. For example, if producer 1 is capable of transforming $t$ units of commodity 1 into $\sqrt{(t+1)^2-1}$ units of commodity 2, and we have $p_1 / p_2 < 1$, then the producer can create plans with infinite profit, thus $\Pi^j(p) = +\infty$, and $S^j(p)$ is undefined.

Consequently, we define "restricted market" to be the same market, except there is a universal upper bound $C$, such that every producer is required to use a production plan $\|y^j\| \leq C$. Each household is required to use a consumption plan $\|x^i\| \leq C$. Denote the corresponding quantities on the restricted market with a tilde. So, for example, $\tilde Z(p)$ is the excess demand function on the restricted market.

$C$ is chosen to be "large enough" for the economy so that the restriction is not in effect under equilibrium conditions (see next section). In detail, $C$ is chosen to be large enough such that:

- For any consumption plan $x$ such that $x \succeq 0, \|x\| = C$, the plan is so "extravagant" that even if all the producers coordinate, they would still fall short of meeting the demand.
- For any list of production plans for the economy $(y^j\in \mathit{PPS}^j)_{j\in J}$, if $\sum_{j\in J} y^j + r \succeq 0$, then $\|y^j\| < C$for each $j\in J$. In other words, for any attainable production plan under the given endowment $r$, each producer's individual production plan must lie strictly within the restriction.

Each requirement is satisfiable.

- Define the set of attainable aggregate production plans to be $\mathit{PPS}_r = \left\{\sum_{j\in J} y^j : y^j \in \mathit{PPS}^j \text{ for each } j\in J, \text{ and }\sum_{j\in J} y^j + r \succeq 0\right\}$, then under the assumptions for the producers given above (especially the "no arbitrarily large free lunch" assumption), $\mathit{PPS}_r$ is bounded for any $r \succeq 0$ (proof omitted). Thus the first requirement is satisfiable.
- Define the set of attainable individual production plans to be $\mathit{PPS}_r^j := \{y^j \in \mathit{PPS}^j: y^j\text{ is a part of some attainable production plan under endowment }r\}$then under the assumptions for the producers given above (especially the "no arbitrarily large transformations" assumption), $\mathit{PPS}_r^j$ is bounded for any $j\in J, r \succeq 0$ (proof omitted). Thus the second requirement is satisfiable.

The two requirements together imply that the restriction is not a real restriction when the production plans and consumption plans are "interior" to the restriction.

- At any price vector $p$, if $\|\tilde S^j(p)\| < C$, then $S^j(p)$ exists and is equal to $\tilde S^j(p)$. In other words, if the production plan of a restricted producer is interior to the artificial restriction, then the unrestricted producer would choose the same production plan. This is proved by exploiting the second requirement on $C$.
- If all $S^j(p) = \tilde S^j(p)$, then the restricted and unrestricted households have the same budget. Now, if we also have $\|\tilde D^i(p)\| < C$, then $D^i(p)$ exists and is equal to $\tilde D^i(p)$. In other words, if the consumption plan of a restricted household is interior to the artificial restriction, then the unrestricted household would choose the same consumption plan. This is proved by exploiting the first requirement on $C$.

These two propositions imply that equilibria for the restricted market are equilibria for the unrestricted market:

Theorem—If $p$ is an equilibrium price vector for the restricted market, then it is also an equilibrium price vector for the unrestricted market. Furthermore, we have $\tilde D^i(p) = D^i(p), \tilde S^j(p) = S^j(p)$.

=== existence of general equilibrium ===
As the last piece of the construction, we define Walras's law:

- The unrestricted market satisfies Walras's law at $p$ iff all $S^j(p), D^i(p)$ are defined, and $\langle p, Z(p)\rangle = 0$, that is,
  $$\sum_{j\in J} \langle p,S^j(p)\rangle + \langle p, r\rangle = \sum_{i\in I} \langle p, D^i(p)\rangle$$
- The restricted market satisfies Walras's law at $p$ iff $\langle p, \tilde Z(p)\rangle = 0$.

Walras's law can be interpreted on both sides:

- On the side of the households, it is said that the aggregate household expenditure is equal to aggregate profit and aggregate income from selling endowments. In other words, every household spends its entire budget.
- On the side of the producers, it is saying that the aggregate profit plus the aggregate cost equals the aggregate revenue.

Theorem—$\tilde Z$ satisfies weak Walras's law: For all $p \in \R_{++}^N$,
$$\langle p, \tilde Z(p)\rangle \leq 0$$
and if $\langle p, \tilde Z(p)\rangle < 0$, then $\tilde Z(p)_n > 0$ for some $n$.

Proof sketch

If total excess demand value is exactly zero, then every household has spent all their budget. Else, some household is restricted to spend only part of their budget. Therefore, that household's consumption bundle is on the boundary of the restriction, that is, $\|\tilde D^i(p)\| = C$. We have chosen (in the previous section) $C$ to be so large that even if all the producers coordinate, they would still fall short of meeting the demand. Consequently there exists some commodity $n$ such that $\tilde D^i(p)_n > \tilde S(p)_n + r_n$

Theorem—An equilibrium price vector exists for the restricted market, at which point the restricted market satisfies Walras's law.

Proof sketch

By definition of equilibrium, if $p$ is an equilibrium price vector for the restricted market, then at that point, the restricted market satisfies Walras's law.

$\tilde Z$ is continuous since all $\tilde S^j, \tilde D^i$ are continuous.

Define a function
$$f(p) = \frac{\max(0, p + \gamma \tilde Z(p))}{\sum_n \max(0, p_n + \gamma \tilde Z(p)_n)}$$
on the price simplex, where $\gamma$ is a fixed positive constant.

By the weak Walras law, this function is well-defined. By Brouwer's fixed-point theorem, it has a fixed point. By the weak Walras law, this fixed point is a market equilibrium.

Note that the above proof does not give an iterative algorithm for finding any equilibrium, as there is no guarantee that the function $f$ is a contraction. This is unsurprising, as there is no guarantee (without further assumptions) that any market equilibrium is a stable equilibrium.

Corollary—An equilibrium price vector exists for the unrestricted market, at which point the unrestricted market satisfies Walras's law.

=== The role of convexity ===
A quarter turn of the convex unit disk leaves the point (0,0) fixed but moves every point on the non–convex unit circle.

In 1954, McKenzie and the pair Arrow and Debreu independently proved the existence of general equilibria by invoking the Kakutani fixed-point theorem on the fixed points of a continuous function from a compact, convex set into itself. In the Arrow–Debreu approach, convexity is essential, because such fixed-point theorems are inapplicable to non-convex sets. For example, the rotation of the unit circle by 90 degrees lacks fixed points, although this rotation is a continuous transformation of a compact set into itself; although compact, the unit circle is non-convex. In contrast, the same rotation applied to the convex hull of the unit circle leaves the point (0,0) fixed. Notice that the Kakutani theorem does not assert that there exists exactly one fixed point. Reflecting the unit disk across the y-axis leaves a vertical segment fixed, so that this reflection has an infinite number of fixed points.

=== Non-convexity in large economies ===
The assumption of convexity precluded many applications, which were discussed in the Journal of Political Economy from 1959 to 1961 by Francis M. Bator, M. J. Farrell, Tjalling Koopmans, and Thomas J. Rothenberg. Ross M. Starr (1969) proved the existence of economic equilibria when some consumer preferences need not be convex. In his paper, Starr proved that a "convexified" economy has general equilibria that are closely approximated by "quasi-equilbria" of the original economy; Starr's proof used the Shapley–Folkman theorem.

=== Uzawa equivalence theorem ===
(Uzawa, 1962) showed that the existence of general equilibrium in an economy characterized by a continuous excess demand function fulfilling Walras's Law is equivalent to Brouwer fixed-Point theorem. Thus, the use of Brouwer's fixed-point theorem is essential for showing that the equilibrium exists in general.

=== Fundamental theorems of welfare economics ===
In welfare economics, one possible concern is finding a Pareto-optimal plan for the economy.

Intuitively, one can consider the problem of welfare economics to be the problem faced by a master planner for the whole economy: given starting endowment $r$ for the entire society, the planner must pick a feasible master plan of production and consumption plans $((x^i)_{i\in I}, (y^j)_{j\in J})$. The master planner has a wide freedom in choosing the master plan, but any reasonable planner should agree that, if someone's utility can be increased, while everyone else's is not decreased, then it is a better plan. That is, the Pareto ordering should be followed.

Define the Pareto ordering on the set of all plans $((x^i)_{i\in I}, (y^j)_{j\in J})$ by $((x^i)_{i\in I}, (y^j)_{j\in J}) \succeq((x'^i)_{i\in I}, (y'^j)_{j\in J})$ iff $x^i \succeq^i x'^i$ for all $i\in I$.

Then, we say that a plan is Pareto-efficient with respect to a starting endowment $r$, iff it is feasible, and there does not exist another feasible plan that is strictly better in Pareto ordering.

In general, there are a whole continuum of Pareto-efficient plans for each starting endowment $r$.

With the set up, we have two fundamental theorems of welfare economics:

First fundamental theorem of welfare economics—Any market equilibrium state is Pareto-efficient.

Proof sketch

The price hyperplane separates the attainable productions and the Pareto-better consumptions. That is, the hyperplane $\langle p^*, q\rangle = \langle p^*, D(p^*)\rangle$ separates $r + \mathit{PPS}_r$ and $U_{++}$, where $U_{++}$ is the set of all $\sum_{i\in I} x'^i$, such that $\forall i\in I, x'^i\in \mathit{CPS}^i, x'^i \succeq^i x^i$, and $\exists i\in I, x'^i \succ^i x^i$. That is, it is the set of aggregates of all possible consumption plans that are strictly Pareto-better.

The attainable productions are on the lower side of the price hyperplane, while the Pareto-better consumptions are strictly on the upper side of the price hyperplane. Thus any Pareto-better plan is not attainable.

- Any Pareto-better consumption plan must cost at least as much for every household, and cost more for at least one household.
- Any attainable production plan must profit at most as much for every producer.

Second fundamental theorem of welfare economics—For any total endowment $r$, and any Pareto-efficient state achievable using that endowment, there exists a distribution of endowments $\{r^i\}_{i\in I}$ and private ownerships $\{\alpha^{i,j}\}_{i\in I, j\in J}$ of the producers, such that the given state is a market equilibrium state for some price vector $p\in \R_{++}^N$.

Proof idea: any Pareto-optimal consumption plan is separated by a hyperplane from the set of attainable consumption plans. The slope of the hyperplane would be the equilibrium prices. Verify that under such prices, each producer and household would find the given state optimal. Verify that Walras's law holds, and so the expenditures match income plus profit, and so it is possible to provide each household with exactly the necessary budget.

Proof

Since the state is attainable, we have $\sum_{i\in I}x^i \preceq \sum_{j\in J}y^j + r$. The equality does not necessarily hold, so we define the set of attainable aggregate consumptions $V := \{r + y - z: y \in \mathit{PPS}, z \succeq 0\}$. Any aggregate consumption bundle in $V$ is attainable, and any outside is not.

Find the market price $p$.

Define $U_{++}$ to be the set of all $\sum_{i\in I} x'^i$, such that $\forall i\in I, x'^i\in \mathit{CPS}^i, x'^i \succeq^i x^i$, and $\exists i\in I, x'^i \succ^i x^i$. That is, it is the set of aggregates of all possible consumption plans that are strictly Pareto-better. Since each $\mathit{CPS}^i$ is convex, and each preference is convex, the set $U_{++}$ is also convex.

Now, since the state is Pareto-optimal, the set $U_{++}$ must be unattainable with the given endowment. That is, $U_{++}$ is disjoint from $V$. Since both sets are convex, there exists a separating hyperplane between them.

Let the hyperplane be defined by $\langle p, q\rangle = c$, where $p\in \R^N, p\neq 0$, and $c= \sum_{i\in I}\langle p, x^i\rangle$. The sign is chosen such that $\langle p, U_{++}\rangle \geq c$ and $\langle p, r+\mathit{PPS}\rangle \leq c$.

Claim: $p \succ 0$.

Suppose not, then there exists some $n\in 1:N$ such that $p_n <0$. Then $\langle p, r + 0 - k e_n\rangle > c$ if $k$ is large enough, but we also have $r + 0 - k e_n\in V$, contradiction.

We have by construction $\langle p, \sum_{i\in I}x^i\rangle = c$, and $\langle p, V\rangle \leq c$. Now we claim: $\langle p, U_{++}\rangle > c$.

For each household $i$, let $U_+^i(x^i)$ be the set of consumption plans for $i$ that are at least as good as $x^i$, and $U_{++}^i(x^i)$ be the set of consumption plans for $i$ that are strictly better than $x^i$.

By local nonsatiation of $\succeq^i$, the closed half-space $\langle p, q\rangle \geq \langle p, x^i\rangle$ contains $U_+^i(x^i)$.

By continuity of $\succeq^i$, the open half-space $\langle p, q\rangle > \langle p, x^i\rangle$ contains $U_{++}^i(x^i)$.

Adding them up, we find that the open half-space $\langle p, q\rangle > c$ contains $U_{++}$.

Claim (Walras's law): $\langle p, r + \sum_j y^j\rangle =c =\langle p, \sum_i x^i\rangle$

Since the production is attainable, we have $r + \sum_j y^j \succeq \sum_i x^i$, and since $p\succ 0$, we have $\langle p, r + \sum_j y^j\rangle \geq \langle p, \sum_i x^i\rangle$.

By construction of the separating hyperplane, we also have $\langle p, r + \sum_j y^j\rangle \leq c =\langle p, \sum_i x^i\rangle$, thus we have an equality.

Claim: at price $p$, each producer $j$ maximizes profit at $y^j$,

If there exists some production plan $y'^j$ such that one producer can reach higher profit $\langle p, y'^j\rangle > \langle p, y^j\rangle$, then

$$\langle p, r\rangle+ \sum_{j\in J}\langle p, y'^j\rangle >\langle p, r\rangle+  \sum_{j\in J}\langle p, y^j\rangle = c$$

but then we would have a point in $r+\mathit{PPS}$ on the other side of the separating hyperplane, violating our construction.

Claim: at price $p$ and budget $\langle p, x^i\rangle$, household $i$ maximizes utility at $x^i$.

Otherwise, there exists some $x'^i$ such that $x'^i \succ^i x^i$ and $\langle p, x'^i\rangle \leq \langle p, x^i\rangle$. Then, consider aggregate consumption bundle $q' := \sum_{i'\in I, i' \neq i}x^i + x'^i$. It is in $U_{++}$, but also satisfies $\langle p, q'\rangle \leq \sum \langle p, x^i\rangle = c$. But this contradicts previous claim that $\langle p, U_{++}\rangle > c$.

By Walras's law, the aggregate endowment income and profit exactly equals aggregate expenditure. It remains to distribute them such that each household $i$ obtains exactly $\langle p, x^i\rangle$ as its budget. This is trivial.

Here is a greedy algorithm to do it: first distribute all endowment of commodity 1 to household 1. If household 1 can reach its budget before distributing all of it, then move on to household 2. Otherwise, start distributing all endowment of commodity 2, etc. Similarly for ownerships of producers.

=== convexity vs strict convexity ===
The assumptions of strict convexity can be relaxed to convexity. This modification changes supply and demand functions from point-valued functions into set-valued functions (or "correspondences"), and the application of Brouwer's fixed-point theorem into Kakutani's fixed-point theorem.

This modification is similar to the generalization of the minimax theorem to the existence of Nash equilibria.

The two fundamental theorems of welfare economics holds without modification.

converting from strict convexity to convexity
strictly convex case	convex case
$\mathit{PPS}^j$ is strictly convex	$\mathit{PPS}^j$ is convex
$\mathit{CPS}^i$ is strictly convex	$\mathit{CPS}^i$ is convex
$\succeq^i$ is strictly convex	$\succeq^i$ is convex
$\tilde S^j(p)$ is point-valued	$\tilde S^j(p)$ is set-valued
$\tilde S^j(p)$ is continuous	$\tilde S^j(p)$ has closed graph ("upper hemicontinuous")
$\langle p, \tilde Z(p)\rangle\leq 0$	$\langle p, z\rangle\leq 0$ for any $z\in \tilde Z(p)$
...	...
equilibrium exists by Brouwer's fixed-point theorem	equilibrium exists by Kakutani's fixed-point theorem

=== equilibrium vs "quasi-equilibrium" ===
The definition of market equilibrium assumes that every household performs utility maximization, subject to budget constraints. That is,
$$\begin{cases}
\max_{x^i} u^i(x^i) \\
\langle p, x^i\rangle \leq M^i(p)
\end{cases}$$
The dual problem would be cost minimization subject to utility constraints. That is,
$$\begin{cases}
u^i(x^i) \geq u^i_0\\
\min_{x^i} \langle p, x^i\rangle
\end{cases}$$
for some real number $u^i_0$. The duality gap between the two problems is nonnegative, and may be positive. Consequently, some authors study the dual problem and the properties of its "quasi-equilibrium" (or "compensated equilibrium"). Every equilibrium is a quasi-equilibrium, but the converse is not necessarily true.

== Extensions ==
=== Accounting for strategic bargaining ===
In the model, all producers and households are "price takers", meaning that they transact with the market using the price vector $p$. In particular, behaviors such as cartel, monopoly, consumer coalition, etc are not modelled. Edgeworth's limit theorem shows that under certain stronger assumptions, the households can do no better than price-take at the limit of an infinitely large economy.

==== Setup ====
In detail, we continue with the economic model on the households and producers, but we consider a different method to design production and distribution of commodities than the market economy. It may be interpreted as a model of a "socialist" economy.

- There is no money, market, or private ownership of producers.
- Since we have abolished private ownership, money, and the profit motive, there is no point in distinguishing one producer from the next. Consequently, instead of each producer planning individually $y^j \in \mathit{PPS}^j$, it is as if the whole society has one great producer producing $y\in \mathit{PPS}$.
- Households still have the same preferences and endowments, but they no longer have budgets.
- Producers do not produce to maximize profit, since there is no profit. All households come together to make a state $((x_i)_{i\in I}, y)$—a production and consumption plan for the whole economy—with the following constraints:
  $$x^i \in \mathit{CPS}^i, y \in \mathit{PPS}, y\succeq \sum_i (x^i- r^i)$$
- Any nonempty subset of households may eliminate all other households, while retaining control of the producers.

This economy is thus a cooperative game with each household being a player, and we have the following concepts from cooperative game theory:

- A blocking coalition is a nonempty subset of households, such that there exists a strictly Pareto-better plan even if they eliminate all other households.
- A state is a core state iff there are no blocking coalitions.
- The core of an economy is the set of core states.

Since we assumed that any nonempty subset of households may eliminate all other households, while retaining control of the producers, the only states that can be executed are the core states. A state that is not a core state would immediately be objected by a coalition of households.

We need one more assumption on $\mathit{PPS}$, that it is a cone, that is, $k \cdot \mathit{PPS} \subset \mathit{PPS}$ for any $k \geq 0$. This assumption rules out two ways for the economy to become trivial.

- The curse of free lunch: In this model, the whole $\mathit{PPS}$ is available to any nonempty coalition, even a coalition of one. Consequently, if nobody has any endowment, and yet $\mathit{PPS}$ contains some "free lunch" $y\succ 0$, then (assuming preferences are monotonic) every household would like to take all of $y$ for itself, and consequently there exists *no* core state. Intuitively, the picture of the world is a committee of selfish people, vetoing any plan that doesn't give the entire free lunch to itself.
- The limit to growth: Consider a society with 2 commodities. One is "labor" and another is "food". Households have only labor as endowment, but they only consume food. The $\mathit{PPS}$ looks like a ramp with a flat top. So, putting in 0-1 thousand hours of labor produces 0-1 thousand kg of food, linearly, but any more labor produces no food. Now suppose each household is endowed with 1 thousand hours of labor. It's clear that every household would immediately block every other household, since it's always better for one to use the entire $\mathit{PPS}$ for itself.

==== Main results (Debreu and Scarf, 1963) ====
Proposition—Market equilibria are core states.

Proof

Define the price hyperplane $\langle p, q \rangle = \langle p, \sum_j y^j\rangle$. Since it's a supporting hyperplane of $\mathit{PPS}$, and $\mathit{PPS}$ is a convex cone, the price hyperplane passes the origin. Thus $\langle p, \sum_j y^j\rangle = \langle p, \sum_i x^i - r^i\rangle = 0$.

Since $\sum_j \langle p, y^j\rangle$ is the total profit, and every producer can at least make zero profit (that is, $0 \in \mathit{PPS}^j$ ), this means that the profit is exactly zero for every producer. Consequently, every household's budget is exactly from selling endowment.

$$\langle p, x^i \rangle = \langle p, r^i\rangle$$

By utility maximization, every household is already doing as much as it could. Consequently, we have $\langle p, U^i_{++}(x^i)\rangle > \langle p, r^i\rangle$.

In particular, for any coalition $I' \subset I$, and any production plan $x'^i$ that is Pareto-better, we have

$$\sum_{i\in I'} \langle p, x'^i \rangle >\sum_{i\in I'} \langle p, r^i \rangle$$
and consequently, the point $\sum_{i\in I'} x'^i - r^i$ lies above the price hyperplane, making it unattainable.

In Debreu and Scarf's paper, they defined a particular way to approach an infinitely large economy, by "replicating households". That is, for any positive integer $K$, define an economy where there are $K$ households that have exactly the same consumption possibility set and preference as household $i$.

Let $x^{i, k}$ stand for the consumption plan of the $k$-th replicate of household $i$. Define a plan to be equitable iff $x^{i, k} \sim^i x^{i, k'}$ for any $i\in I$ and $k, k'\in K$.

In general, a state would be quite complex, treating each replicate differently. However, core states are significantly simpler: they are equitable, treating every replicate equally.

Proposition—Any core state is equitable.

Proof

We use the "underdog coalition".

Consider a core state $x^{i, k}$. Define average distributions $\bar x^{i} := \frac 1K \sum_{k\in K} x^{i,k}$.

It is attainable, so we have $K \sum_{i} (\bar x^i - r^i) \in \mathit{PPS}$

Suppose there exist any inequality, that is, some $x^{i, k} \succ^i x^{i, k'}$, then by convexity of preferences, we have $\bar x^i \succ^i x^{i, k'}$, where $k'$ is the worst-treated household of type $i$.

Now define the "underdog coalition" consisting of the worst-treated household of each type, and they propose to distribute according to $\bar x^i$. This is Pareto-better for the coalition, and since $PP$ is conic, we also have $\sum_i(\bar x^i - r^i) \in \mathit{PPS}$, so the plan is attainable. Contradiction.

Consequently, when studying core states, it is sufficient to consider one consumption plan for each type of households. Now, define $C_K$ to be the set of all core states for the economy with $K$ replicates per household. It is clear that $C_1 \supset C_2 \supset \cdots$, so we may define the limit set of core states $C := \cap_{K=1}^\infty C_K$.

We have seen that $C$ contains the set of market equilibria for the original economy. The converse is true under minor additional assumption:

(Debreu and Scarf, 1963)—If $\mathit{PPS}$ is a polygonal cone, or if every $\mathit{CPS}^i$ has nonempty interior with respect to $\R^N$, then $C$ is the set of market equilibria for the original economy.

The assumption that $\mathit{PPS}$ is a polygonal cone, or every $\mathit{CPS}^i$ has nonempty interior, is necessary to avoid the technical issue of "quasi-equilibrium". Without the assumption, we can only prove that $C$ is contained in the set of quasi-equilibria.

=== Accounting for nonconvexity ===
The assumption that production possibility sets are convex is a strong constraint, as it implies that there is no economy of scale. Similarly, we may consider nonconvex consumption possibility sets and nonconvex preferences. In such cases, the supply and demand functions $S^j(p), D^i(p)$ may be discontinuous with respect to price vector, thus a general equilibrium may not exist.

However, we may "convexity" the economy, find an equilibrium for it, then by the Shapley–Folkman–Starr theorem, it is an approximate equilibrium for the original economy.

In detail, given any economy satisfying all the assumptions given, except convexity of $\mathit{PPS}^j, \mathit{CPS}^i$ and $\succeq^i$, we define the "convexified economy" to be the same economy, except that

- $\mathit{PPS}'^j = \mathrm{Conv}(\mathit{PPS}^j)$
- $\mathit{CPS}'^i = \mathrm{Conv}(\mathit{CPS}^i)$
- $x \succeq'^i y$ iff $\forall z \in \mathit{CPS}^i, y \in \mathrm{Conv}(U_+^i(z)) \implies x \in \mathrm{Conv}(U_+^i(z))$.

where $\mathrm{Conv}$ denotes the convex hull.

With this, any general equilibrium for the convexified economy is also an approximate equilibrium for the original economy. That is, if $p^*$ is an equilibrium price vector for the convexified economy, then
$$\begin{align}
d(D'(p^*) - S'(p^*), D(p^*) - S(p^*)) &\leq N\sqrt{L} \\
d(r, D(p^*) - S(p^*)) &\leq N\sqrt{L}
\end{align}$$
where $d(\cdot, \cdot)$ is the Euclidean distance, and $L$ is any upper bound on the inner radii of all $\mathit{PPS}^j, \mathit{CPS}^i$ (see page on Shapley–Folkman–Starr theorem for the definition of inner radii).

The convexified economy may not satisfy the assumptions. For example, the set $\{(x, 0): x \geq 0\}\cup \{(x,y): xy = 1, x > 0\}$ is closed, but its convex hull is not closed. Imposing the further assumption that the convexified economy also satisfies the assumptions, we find that the original economy always has an approximate equilibrium.

=== Accounting for time, space, and uncertainty ===
The commodities in the Arrow–Debreu model are entirely abstract. Thus, although it is typically represented as a static market, it can be used to model time, space, and uncertainty by splitting one commodity into several, each contingent on a certain time, place, and state of the world. For example, "apples" can be divided into "apples in New York in September if oranges are available" and "apples in Chicago in June if oranges are not available".

Trade between agents can be modeled as occurring in one of two ways. Either Arrow-Debreu securities are traded at the beginning of time, for all possible realization of uncertainty, and then no trade ever occurs again; or Arrow securities are traded sequentially every period.

Arrow-Debreu securities are also known as state-price securities, pure securities, or primitive securities. They are a contracts that agree to pay one unit of a numeraire (a currency or a commodity) if a particular state occurs at a particular time in the future and pays zero numeraire in all the other states. The price of this security is the state price of this particular state of the world. The state price vector is the vector of state prices for all states.

An Arrow security is an instrument with a fixed payout of one unit in a specified state and no payout in other states.

==== Example ====
Imagine a world where two states are possible tomorrow: peace (P) and war (W). Denote the random variable which represents the state as ω; denote tomorrow's random variable as ω_{1}. Thus, ω_{1} can take two values: ω_{1}=P and ω_{1}=W.

Let's imagine that:

- There is a security that pays off £1 if tomorrow's state is "P" and nothing if the state is "W". The price of this security is q_{P}
- There is a security that pays off £1 if tomorrow's state is "W" and nothing if the state is "P". The price of this security is q_{W}

The prices q_{P} and q_{W} are the state prices.

The factors that affect these state prices are:

- "Time preferences for consumption and the productivity of capital". That is to say that the time value of money affects the state prices.
- The probabilities of ω_{1}=P and ω_{1}=W. The more likely a move to W is, the higher the price q_{W} gets, since q_{W} insures the agent against the occurrence of state W. The seller of this insurance would demand a higher premium (if the economy is efficient).
- The preferences of the agent. Suppose the agent has a standard concave utility function which depends on the state of the world. Assume that the agent loses an equal amount if the state is "W" as he would gain if the state was "P". Now, even if you assume that the above-mentioned probabilities ω_{1}=P and ω_{1}=W are equal, the changes in utility for the agent are not: Due to his decreasing marginal utility, the utility gain from a "peace dividend" tomorrow would be lower than the utility lost from the "war" state. If our agent were rational, he would pay more to insure against the down state than his net gain from the up state would be.

==== In finance ====
State prices may relatedly be applied in derivatives pricing and hedging: a contract whose settlement value is a function of an underlying asset whose value is uncertain at contract date, can be decomposed as a linear combination of its Arrow–Debreu securities, and thus as a weighted sum of its state prices; see Contingent claim analysis. Breeden and Litzenberger's work in 1978 established the latter, more general use of state prices in finance.

Since their work, a large number of researchers have used options to extract Arrow–Debreu prices for a variety of applications in financial economics.

Analogously, for a continuous random variable indicating a continuum of possible states, the value is found by integrating over the state price density.

=== Accounting for the existence of money ===
No theory of money is offered here, and it is assumed that the economy works without the help of a good serving as medium of exchange.

— Gérard Debreu, Theory of value: An axiomatic analysis of economic equilibrium (1959)

To the pure theorist, at the present juncture the most interesting and challenging aspect of money is that it can find no place in an Arrow–Debreu economy. This circumstance should also be of considerable significance to macroeconomists, but it rarely is.

— Frank Hahn, The foundations of monetary theory (1987)

Typically, economists consider the functions of money to be as a unit of account, store of value, medium of exchange, and standard of deferred payment. This is however incompatible with the Arrow–Debreu complete market described above. In the complete market, there is only a one-time transaction at the market "at the beginning of time". After that, households and producers merely execute their planned productions, consumptions, and deliveries of commodities until the end of time. Consequently, there is no use for storage of value or medium of exchange. This applies not just to the Arrow–Debreu complete market, but also to models (such as those with markets of contingent commodities and Arrow insurance contracts) that differ in form, but are mathematically equivalent to it.

=== Computing general equilibria ===
Scarf (1967) was the first algorithm that computes the general equilibrium. See Scarf (2018) and Kubler (2012) for reviews.

=== Number of equilibria ===
Certain economies at certain endowment vectors may have infinitely equilibrium price vectors. However, "generically", an economy has only finitely many equilibrium price vectors. Here, "generically" means "on all points, except a closed set of Lebesgue measure zero", as in Sard's theorem.

There are many such genericity theorems. One example is the following:

Genericity—For any strictly positive endowment distribution $r^1, ..., r^I \in \R_{++}^N$, and any strictly positive price vector $p\in \R_{++}^N$, define the excess demand $Z(p, r^1, ..., r^I)$ as before.

If on all $p, r^1, ..., r^I \in \R_{++}^N$,

- $Z(p, r^1, ..., r^I)$ is well-defined,
- $Z$ is differentiable,
- $\nabla_p Z$ has $(N-1)$,

then for generically any endowment distribution $r^1, ..., r^I \in \R_{++}^N$, there are only finitely many equilibria $p^* \in \R_{++}^N$.

Proof (sketch)

Define the "equilibrium manifold" as the set of solutions to $Z=0$. By Walras's law, one of the constraints is redundant. By assumptions that $\nabla_p Z$ has rank $(N-1)$, no more constraints are redundant. Thus the equilibrium manifold has dimension $N \times I$, which is equal to the space of all distributions of strictly positive endowments $\R_{++}^{N \times I}$.

By continuity of $Z$, the projection is closed. Thus by Sard's theorem, the projection from the equilibrium manifold to $\R_{++}^{N \times I}$ is critical on only a set of measure 0. It remains to check that the preimage of the projection is generically not just discrete, but also finite.

== See also ==
- Model (economics)
- Incomplete markets
- Arrow-Debreu exchange market - a simpler market model, in which there are only households (who can be both buyers and sellers), but no producers.
- Fisher market - an even simpler market model, in which there are only buyers; the total quantity of each product is given, and each buyer comes only with a monetary budget.
- List of asset pricing articles
- Financial economics § Underlying economics
