= Monotone preferences =

Economics term

In economics, an agent's preferences are said to be weakly monotonic if, given a consumption bundle $x$, the agent prefers all consumption bundles $y$ that have more of all goods. That is, $y \gg x$ implies $y\succ x$. An agent's preferences are said to be strongly monotonic if, given a consumption bundle $x$, the agent prefers all consumption bundles $y$ that have more of at least one good, and not less in any other good. That is, $y\geq x$ and $y\neq x$ imply $y\succ x$.

This definition defines monotonic increasing preferences. Monotonic decreasing preferences can often be defined to be compatible with this definition. For instance, an agent's preferences for pollution may be monotonic decreasing (less pollution is better). In this case, the agent's preferences for lack of pollution are monotonic increasing.

Much of consumer theory relies on a weaker assumption, local nonsatiation. An example of preferences which are weakly monotonic but not strongly monotonic are those represented by a Leontief utility function. If an agent has monotone preferences which means the marginal rate of substitution of the agent's indifference curve is positive.

Given two products X and Y. If the agent is strictly preferred to X, it can get the equivalent statement that X is weakly preferred to Y and Y is not weakly preferred to X. If the agent is indifferent to X and Y, it can get the equivalent statement that X is weakly preferred to Y and Y is weakly preferred to X. If the agent is weakly preferred to X, it can get the equivalent statement that X is strictly preferred to Y or Y is indifferent to X.

== See also ==
- Monotonic function § Monotonicity in calculus and analysis
- Monotonicity criterion in voting.
- Resource monotonicity
- Strict
