= Leontief utilities =

In economics, especially in consumer theory, a Leontief utility function is a function of the form: $u(x_1,\ldots,x_m)=\min\left\{\frac{x_1}{w_1},\ldots,\frac{x_m}{w_m}\right\} .$ where:

- $m$ is the number of different goods in the economy.
- $x_i$ (for $i\in 1,\dots,m$) is the amount of good $i$ in the bundle.
- $w_i$ (for $i\in 1,\dots,m$) is the weight of good $i$ for the consumer.

This form of utility function was first conceptualized by Wassily Leontief.

== Examples ==
Leontief utility functions represent complementary goods. For example:

- Suppose $x_1$ is the number of left shoes and $x_2$ the number of right shoes. A consumer can only use pairs of shoes. Hence, his utility is $\min(x_1,x_2)$.
- In a cloud computing environment, there is a large server that runs many different tasks. Suppose a certain type of a task requires 2 CPUs, 3 gigabytes of memory and 4 gigabytes of disk-space to complete. The utility of the user is equal to the number of completed tasks. Hence, it can be represented by: $\min({x_{\mathrm{CPU}}\over 2}, {x_{\mathrm{MEM}}\over 3}, {x_{\mathrm{DISK}}\over 4})$.

== Properties ==
A consumer with a Leontief utility function has the following properties:

- The preferences are weakly monotone but not strongly monotone: having a larger quantity of a single good does not increase utility, but having a larger quantity of all goods does.
- The preferences are weakly convex, but not strictly convex: a mix of two equivalent bundles may be either equivalent to or better than the original bundles.
- The indifference curves are L-shaped and their corners are determined by the weights. E.g., for the function $\min(x_1/2, x_2/3)$, the corners of the indifferent curves are at $(2t,3t)$ where $t\in[0,\infty)$.
- The consumer's demand is always to get the goods in constant ratios determined by the weights, i.e. the consumer demands a bundle $(w_1 t,\ldots,w_m t)$ where $t$ is determined by the income: $t = \text{Income} / (p_1 w_1 + \dots + p_m w_m)$. Since the Marshallian demand function of every good is increasing in income, all goods are normal goods.

== Competitive equilibrium ==
Since Leontief utilities are not strictly convex, they do not satisfy the requirements of the Arrow–Debreu model for existence of a competitive equilibrium. Indeed, a Leontief economy is not guaranteed to have a competitive equilibrium. There are restricted families of Leontief economies that do have a competitive equilibrium.

There is a reduction from the problem of finding a Nash equilibrium in a bimatrix game to the problem of finding a competitive equilibrium in a Leontief economy. This has several implications:

- It is NP-hard to say whether a particular family of Leontief exchange economies, that is guaranteed to have at least one equilibrium, has more than one equilibrium.
- It is NP-hard to decide whether a Leontief economy has an equilibrium.

Moreover, the Leontief market exchange problem does not have a fully polynomial-time approximation scheme, unless PPAD ⊆ P.

On the other hand, there are algorithms for finding an approximate equilibrium for some special Leontief economies.

== Application ==
Dominant resource fairness is a common rule for resource allocation in cloud computing systems, which assums that users have Leontief preferences.
