= Walrasian auction =

Theoretical auction process where prices adjust until all markets clear

A Walrasian auction, introduced by Léon Walras, is a type of simultaneous auction where each agent calculates its demand for the good at every possible price and submits this to an auctioneer. The price is then set so that the total demand across all agents equals the total amount of the good. Thus, a Walrasian auction perfectly matches the supply and the demand.

Walras suggested that equilibrium would always be achieved through a process of tâtonnement (French for "trial and error"), a form of hill climbing. In the 1970s, however, the Sonnenschein–Mantel–Debreu theorem proved that such a process would not necessarily reach a unique and stable equilibrium, even if the market is populated with perfectly rational agents.

== Walrasian auctioneer ==
The Walrasian auctioneer is the presumed auctioneer that matches supply and demand in a market of perfect competition. The auctioneer provides for the features of perfect competition: perfect information and no transaction costs. The process is called tâtonnement, or groping, relating to finding the market clearing price for all commodities and giving rise to general equilibrium.

The device is an attempt to avoid one of deepest conceptual problems of perfect competition, which may, essentially, be defined by the stipulation that no agent can affect prices. But if no one can affect prices no one can change them, so prices cannot change. However, involving as it does an artificial solution, the device is less than entirely satisfactory.

== As a mistranslation ==
Until Walker and van Daal's 2014 translation (retitled Elements of Theoretical Economics), William Jaffé's Elements of Pure Economics (1954) was for many years the only English translation of Walras's Éléments d'économie politique pure.

Walker and van Daal argue that the idea of the Walrasian auction and Walrasian auctioneer resulted from Jaffé's mistranslation of the French word crieurs (criers) into auctioneers. Walker and van Daal call this "a momentous error that has misled generations of readers into thinking that the markets in Walras's model are auction markets and that he assigned the function of changing prices in his model to an auctioneer."

== See also ==
- Double auction
- Walras' law
- Fisher market - a different market model.
- Arrow-Debreu market - yet another market model.

== Bibliography ==
- Ackerman, Frank (2002). "Still dead after all these years: interpreting the failure of general equilibrium theory" (PDF). Journal of Economic Methodology. 9 (2): 119–139. doi:10.1080/13501780210137083. S2CID 154640384.
- Walras, Léon (2014). Leon Walras's Elements of Theoretical Economics. Cambridge University Press. ISBN 978-1-107-06413-3.
- Wurman, Peter R. (1999). Market Structure and Multidimensional Auction Design for Computational Economies (PhD thesis). University of Michigan.
