= Convex preferences =

Concept in economics

In economics, convex preferences are an individual's ordering of various outcomes, typically with regard to the amounts of various goods consumed, with the property that, roughly speaking, "averages are better than the extremes". This implies that the consumer prefers a variety of goods to having more of a single good. The concept roughly corresponds to the concept of diminishing marginal utility without requiring utility functions.

== Notation ==
Comparable to the greater-than-or-equal-to ordering relation $\geq$ for real numbers, the notation $\succeq$ below can be translated as: 'is at least as good as' (in preference satisfaction).

Similarly, $\succ$ can be translated as 'is strictly better than' (in preference satisfaction), and Similarly, $\sim$ can be translated as 'is equivalent to' (in preference satisfaction).

== Definition ==
Use x, y, and z to denote three consumption bundles (combinations of various quantities of various goods). Formally, a preference relation $\succeq$ on the consumption set X is called convex if whenever

$x, y, z \in X$ where $y \succeq x$ and $z \succeq x$,

then for every $\theta\in[0,1]$:

$$\theta y + (1-\theta) z \succeq x$$.

i.e., for any two bundles that are each viewed as being at least as good as a third bundle, a weighted average of the two bundles is viewed as being at least as good as the third bundle.

A preference relation $\succeq$ is called strictly convex if whenever

$x, y, z \in X$ where $y \succeq x$, $z \succeq x$, and $y \neq z$,

then for every $\theta\in(0,1)$:

$$\theta y + (1-\theta) z \succ x$$

i.e., for any two distinct bundles that are each viewed as being at least as good as a third bundle, a weighted average of the two bundles (including a positive amount of each bundle) is viewed as being strictly better than the third bundle.

== Alternative definition ==
Use x and y to denote two consumption bundles. A preference relation $\succeq$ is called convex if for any

$x, y \in X$ where $y \succeq x$

then for every $\theta\in[0,1]$:

$$\theta y + (1-\theta) x \succeq x$$.

That is, if a bundle y is preferred over a bundle x, then any mix of y with x is still preferred over x.

A preference relation is called strictly convex if whenever

$x, y \in X$ where $y \sim x$, and $x \neq y$,

then for every $\theta\in(0,1)$:

$$\theta y + (1-\theta) x \succ x$$.
$$\theta y + (1-\theta) x \succ y$$.

That is, for any two bundles that are viewed as being equivalent, a weighted average of the two bundles is better than each of these bundles.

== Examples ==
1. If there is only a single commodity type, then any weakly-monotonically increasing preference relation is convex. This is because, if $y \geq x$, then every weighted average of y and ס is also $\geq x$.

2. Consider an economy with two commodity types, 1 and 2. Consider a preference relation represented by the following Leontief utility function:

$$u(x_1,x_2) = \min(x_1,x_2)$$

This preference relation is convex. Proof: suppose x and y are two equivalent bundles, i.e. $\min(x_1,x_2) = \min(y_1,y_2)$. If the minimum-quantity commodity in both bundles is the same (e.g. commodity 1), then this implies $x_1=y_1 \leq x_2,y_2$. Then, any weighted average also has the same amount of commodity 1, so any weighted average is equivalent to $x$ and $y$. If the minimum commodity in each bundle is different (e.g. $x_1\leq x_2$ but $y_1\geq y_2$), then this implies $x_1=y_2 \leq x_2,y_1$. Then $\theta x_1 + (1-\theta) y_1 \geq x_1$ and $\theta x_2 + (1-\theta) y_2 \geq y_2$, so $\theta x + (1-\theta) y \succeq x,y$. This preference relation is convex, but not strictly-convex.

3. A preference relation represented by linear utility functions is convex, but not strictly convex. Whenever $x\sim y$, every convex combination of $x,y$ is equivalent to any of them.

4. Consider a preference relation represented by:

$$u(x_1,x_2) = \max(x_1,x_2)$$

This preference relation is not convex. Proof: let $x=(3,5)$ and $y=(5,3)$. Then $x\sim y$ since both have utility 5. However, the convex combination $0.5 x + 0.5 y = (4,4)$ is worse than both of them since its utility is 4.

== Relation to indifference curves and utility functions ==
A set of convex-shaped indifference curves displays convex preferences: Given a convex indifference curve containing the set of all bundles (of two or more goods) that are all viewed as equally desired, the set of all goods bundles that are viewed as being at least as desired as those on the indifference curve is a convex set.

Convex preferences with their associated convex indifference mapping arise from quasi-concave utility functions, although these are not necessary for the analysis of preferences. For example, Constant Elasticity of Substitution (CES) utility functions describe convex, homothetic preferences. CES preferences are self-dual and both primal and dual CES preferences yield systems of indifference curves that may exhibit any degree of convexity.

== See also ==
- Convex function
- Level set
- Quasi-convex function
- Semi-continuous function
- Shapley–Folkman lemma
