= Anna Bogomolnaia =

Russian economist

Anna Vladimirovna Bogomolnaia (Russian: Анна Владимировна Богомольная) is a Russian economist specializing in microeconomics and game theory. She is a professor in economics at the Adam Smith Business School of the University of Glasgow, and was until 2022 chief research fellow of the International Laboratory for Game Theory and Decision Making at the Higher School of Economics in Russia.

== Education and career ==
After earning a master's degree in mathematics at Saint Petersburg State University in 1989, Bogomolnaia went to the Autonomous University of Barcelona for doctoral studies in economics. Her 1998 dissertation, Medians and Lotteries: Strategy-Proof Social Choice Rules for Restricted Domains, was supervised by Salvador Barberà.

After earning her doctorate, she worked at the University of Nottingham, became an assistant professor at Southern Methodist University, and earned tenure at Rice University in 2005. She took her positions at the University of Glasgow and the Higher School of Economics in 2013 and 2015 respectively.

== Contributions ==
Bogomolnaia is known for her work on coalitions and on randomized solutions to assignment problems. With Hervé Moulin she formulated the probabilistic-serial procedure for solving the fair random assignment problem. With Matthew O. Jackson she introduced the concept of hedonic games to model coalition-forming in multiplayer games.
