= Hervé Moulin =

French mathematician (born 1950)

- Born: August 1, 1950 (age 76); Paris, France

Academic background
- Education: École Normale Supérieure; Université Paris-Dauphine
- Doctoral advisor: Jean-Pierre Aubin
- Influences: Marquis de Condorcet, Jean-Charles de Borda, John von Neumann

Academic work
- Discipline: Game theory, fair division, social choice, mathematical economics
- Institutions: ENSAE Paris; Virginia Tech; Rice University; Duke University; University of Glasgow
- Doctoral students: Josue Ortega
- Notable ideas: Random assignment, cost sharing, dominance solvable games
- Awards: Fellow of the Econometric Society, Council Member of the Game Theory Society, President of the Society for Social Choice and Welfare
- Website: Information at IDEAS / RePEc

Hervé Moulin FRSE FBA (born 1 August 1950) is a French mathematician who is the Donald J. Robertson Chair of Economics at the Adam Smith Business School at the University of Glasgow. He is known for his research contributions in mathematical economics, in particular in the fields of mechanism design, social choice, game theory and fair division. He has written five books and over 100 peer-reviewed articles.

== Education and career ==
Moulin obtained his undergraduate degree from the École Normale Supérieure in Paris in 1971 and his doctoral degree in Mathematics at the University of Paris-IX in 1975 with a thesis on zero-sum games, which was published in French at the Mémoires de la Société Mathématique de France and in English in the Journal of Mathematical Analysis and its Applications.

Moulin was the George A. Peterkin Professor of Economics at Rice University (from 1999 to 2013):, the James B. Duke Professor of Economics at Duke University (from 1989 to 1999), the University Distinguished Professor at Virginia Tech (from 1987 to 1989), and Academic Supervisor at Higher School of Economics in St. Petersburg, Russia (from 2015 to 2022). He is a fellow of the Econometric Society since 1983, and the president of the Game Theory Society for the term 2016 - 2018. He also served as president of the Society for Social Choice and Welfare for the period of 1998 to 1999. He became a Fellow of the Royal Society of Edinburgh in 2015.

== Research ==
On 1979, Moulin published a seminal paper in Econometrica introducing the notion of dominance solvable games. Dominance solvability is a solution concept for games which is based on an iterated procedure of deletion of dominated strategies by all participants. Dominance solvability is a stronger concept than Nash equilibrium because it does not require ex-ante coordination. Its only requirement is iterated common knowledge of rationality. His work on this concept was mentioned in Eric Maskin's Nobel Prize Lecture.

One year later he proved an interesting result concerning the famous Gibbard-Satterthwaite Theorem, which states that any voting procedure on the universal domain of preferences whose range contains more than two alternatives is either dictatorial or manipulable. Moulin proved that it is possible to define non-dictatorial and non-manipulable social choice functions in the restricted domain of single-peaked preferences, i.e. those in which there is a unique best option, and other options are better as they are closer to the favorite one. Moreover, he provided a characterization of such rules. This paper inspired a whole literature on achieving strategy-proofness and fairness (even in a weak form as non-dictatorial schemes) on restricted domains of preferences.

Moulin is also known for his seminal work in cost sharing and assignment problems. In particular, jointly with Anna Bogomolnaia, he proposed the probabilistic-serial procedure as a solution to the fair random assignment problem, which consists of dividing several goods among a number of persons. Probabilistic serial allows each person to "eat" her favorite shares, hence defining a probabilistic outcome. It always produces an outcome which is unambiguously efficient ex-ante, and thus has a strong claim over the popular random priority. The paper was published in 2001 in the Journal of Economic Theory. By summer of 2016, the article had 395 citations.

He has been credited as the first proposer of the famous beauty contest game, also known as the guessing game, which shows that players fail to anticipate strategic behavior from other players. Experiments testing the equilibrium prediction of this game started the field of experimental economics.

Moulin's research has been supported in part by seven grants from the US National Science Foundation. He collaborates as an adviser with the fair division website Spliddit, created by Ariel Procaccia. On the occasion of his 65th birthday, the Paris School of Economics and the Aix-Marseille University organised a conference in his honor, with Peyton Young, William Thomson, Salvador Barbera, and Moulin himself among the speakers. In July 2018 Moulin was elected Fellow of the British Academy (FBA).

== Bibliography ==
Moulin has published work jointly with Matthew O. Jackson, Scott Shenker, and Anna Bogomolnaia, among many other academics.

=== Books ===
- Moulin, Hervé (1979). Fondation de la théorie des jeux. Collection Méthodes (in French). Paris: Hermann. ISBN 978-2-7056-5905-9.
- Moulin, Hervé; Fogelman-Soulié, Françoise (1979). La convexité dans les mathématiques de la décision: optimisation et théorie micro-économique. Collection Méthodes (in French). Paris: Hermann. ISBN 978-2-7056-5904-2.
- Moulin, Hervé (1981). Théorie des jeux pour l'économie et la politique. Collection Méthodes (in French). Paris: Hermann. ISBN 978-2-7056-5931-8.
- Moulin, Hervé (1983). The strategy of social choice. Advanced textbooks in economics. Amsterdam New York: North-Holland Pub. ISBN 978-0-444-86371-3.
- Moulin, Hervé (1986). Game theory for the social sciences. Studies in game theory and mathematical economics (2nd ed.). New York: New York University Press. ISBN 978-0-8147-5430-6.
- Moulin, Hervé (1988). Axioms of cooperative decision making. Econometric Society monographs. Cambridge [England]; New York: Cambridge University Press. ISBN 978-0-521-36055-5.
- Moulin, Hervé (1995). Cooperative Microeconomics: A Game-Theoretic Introduction. Princeton University Press.
- Moulin, Hervé (2004). Fair division and collective welfare. Cambridge, MA: MIT Press. ISBN 978-0-262-63311-6.
- Moulin, Hervé (2017). La construction d'une politique spatiale en France: entre indépendance nationale et dynamiques européennes, 1945-1975. Explorations (in French). Paris: Beauchesne. ISBN 978-2-7010-2258-1.
- Laslier, Jean-François; Moulin, Hervé; Sanver, M. Remzi; Zwicker, William S., eds. (2019). The Future of Economic Design: The Continuing Development of a Field as Envisioned by Its Researchers. Studies in Economic Design. Cham: Springer International Publishing. doi:10.1007/978-3-030-18050-8. ISBN 978-3-030-18049-2.

== See also ==
- List of economists
