= Pairwise testing =

Pairwise testing may refer to:

- All-pairs testing
- Pairwise comparison

== See also ==
- Paired difference test
