= Josue Ortega =

Josue Ortega may refer to:

- Josue Ortega (academic)
- Josue Ortega (politician)
