= Dispersion function =

Statistical characterization of distribution functions

In probability theory and statistics, the dispersion function is a functional that characterizes a probability distribution by measuring the expected absolute deviation of a random variable from any given point. It was introduced by J. Muñoz-Pérez and A. Sánchez-Gómez in 1990 as a tool for studying statistical dispersion and inducing a partial ordering of distributions.

== Definition ==
Let $X$ be a real-valued random variable with a finite expectation ($X \in \mathcal{L}_1$). The dispersion function $D_X(u)$ is defined as the absolute moment of order $r=1$ of the random variable $X$ with respect to $u$:

$$D_X(u) = E|X - u|, \quad \forall u \in \mathbb{R}$$

== Characterization of the distribution ==
The dispersion function uniquely determines the cumulative distribution function (CDF) of $X$. If $C_F$ is the set of continuity points of $F_X$, the distribution function can be recovered via the derivative of the dispersion function:

$$F_X(u) = \frac{1}{2}(D_X'(u) + 1)$$

== Properties ==
The dispersion function has the following properties:

- Convexity: $D_X$ is a convex function on $\mathbb{R}$.
- Differentiability: It is differentiable, and its derivative $D_X'$ has at most a countable number of discontinuity points.
- Asymptotic behavior of the derivative: The limits of the derivative are $\lim_{x \to \infty} D_X'(x) = 1$ and $\lim_{x \to -\infty} D_X'(x) = -1$.
- Mean relationship: The limits involving the mean $EX$ are given by $\lim_{x \to \infty} [D_X(x) - x] = -EX$ and $\lim_{x \to -\infty} [D_X(x) + x] = EX$.

== Relation to Variance ==
For a random variable with finite variance $\sigma^2$, the $L_1$-distance between its dispersion function and the dispersion function of the degenerate random variable at its mean ($D_{EX}(u) = |EX - u|$) is exactly the variance:

$$\int_{-\infty}^{+\infty} |D_X(u) - D_{EX}(u)| du = \sigma^2$$

== Dispersive Ordering ==
In the study of stochastic orders, the dispersion function provides a necessary and sufficient condition for the dispersive ordering. This concept builds upon earlier work by Bickel and Lehmann regarding descriptive statistics for non-parametric models. According to Shaked and Shanthikumar, this characterization allows for the comparison of distributions even when they have the same finite support, such as comparing a continuous uniform distribution to a triangular distribution (Simpson's distribution).

== Generalizations ==
A generalized dispersion function of order p is defined as the $L_p$-distance between the quantile function $Q_X$ and the quantile function of a degenerate variable at $u$:

$$D_X(u,p) = \left( \int_{0}^{1} [Q_X(t) - u]^p d\Lambda(t) \right)^{1/p}$$

where $\Lambda$ is a probability distribution on $(0,1)$ and $p$ is any positive number.

== See also ==
- Statistical dispersion
- Stochastic ordering
- Quantile function
- Lp space
