= EQX =

EQX or EQx can refer to:

- WEQX, also known as EQX, a radio station broadcasting from Manchester, Vermont, U.S.
- Equair, an airline from Ecuador, by ICAO code
- Equinox Gold Corp., a metals and mining company, by stock ticker; see S&P/TSX Composite Index#List of companies
- Equitable up to any item, a type of object allocation that is part of efficient approximately fair item allocation
