= Mean-preserving spread =

In probability and statistics, a mean-preserving spread (MPS) is a change from one probability distribution A to another probability distribution B, where B is formed by spreading out one or more portions of A's probability density function or probability mass function while leaving the mean (the expected value) unchanged. As such, the concept of mean-preserving spreads provides a stochastic ordering of equal-mean gambles (probability distributions) according to their degree of risk; this ordering is partial, meaning that of two equal-mean gambles, it is not necessarily true that either is a mean-preserving spread of the other. Distribution A is said to be a mean-preserving contraction of B if B is a mean-preserving spread of A.

Ranking gambles by mean-preserving spreads is a special case of ranking gambles by second-order stochastic dominance – namely, the special case of equal means: If B is a mean-preserving spread of A, then A is second-order stochastically dominant over B; and the converse holds if A and B have equal means.

If B is a mean-preserving spread of A, then B has a higher variance than A and the expected values of A and B are identical; but the converse is not in general true, because the variance is a complete ordering while ordering by mean-preserving spreads is only partial.

== Example ==
This example shows that to have a mean-preserving spread does not require that all or most of the probability mass move away from the mean. Let A have equal probabilities $1/100$ on each outcome $x_{Ai}$ , with $x_{Ai}=198$ for $i=1,\dots, 50$ and $x_{Ai}=202$ for $i=51,\dots,100$; and let B have equal probabilities $1/100$ on each outcome $x_{Bi}$, with $x_{B1}=100$, $x_{Bi}=200$ for $i=2,\dots,99$, and $x_{B100}=300$. Here B has been constructed from A by moving one chunk of 1% probability from 198 to 100 and moving 49 probability chunks from 198 to 200, and then moving one probability chunk from 202 to 300 and moving 49 probability chunks from 202 to 200. This sequence of two mean-preserving spreads is itself a mean-preserving spread, despite the fact that 98% of the probability mass has moved to the mean (200).

== Mathematical definitions ==
Let $x_A$ and $x_B$ be the random variables associated with gambles A and B. Then B is a mean-preserving spread of A if and only if $x_B \overset {d}{=} (x_A + z)$ for some random variable $z$ having $E(z\mid x_A)=0$ for all values of $x_A$. Here $\overset{d}{=}$ means "is equal in distribution to" (that is, "has the same distribution as").

Mean-preserving spreads can also be defined in terms of the cumulative distribution functions $F_A$ and $F_B$ of A and B. If A and B have equal means, B is a mean-preserving spread of A if and only if the area under $F_A$ from minus infinity to $x$ is less than or equal to that under $F_B$ from minus infinity to $x$ for all real numbers $x$, with strict inequality at some $x$.

Both of these mathematical definitions replicate those of second-order stochastic dominance for the case of equal means.

== Relation to expected utility theory ==
If B is a mean-preserving spread of A then A will be preferred by all expected utility maximizers having concave utility. The converse also holds: if A and B have equal means and A is preferred by all expected utility maximizers having concave utility, then B is a mean-preserving spread of A.

== See also ==
- Stochastic ordering
- Risk (statistics)
- Scale parameter
