= Random serial dictatorship =

Random serial dictatorship, also called random priority, can refer to:

- A general rule for social choice - a variant of the dictatorship mechanism.
- A specific rule for item allocation - see random priority item allocation.
