= Josue Ortega (academic) =

British academic

Josue Ortega is a British academic and lecturer in economics at Queen's University Belfast. He is the author of a controversial article that suggests that the emergence of online dating has caused an increase in the number of interracial marriages in the US. Ortega's findings have been covered by international media, including Forbes, the Times, New Scientist, Business Insider and the MIT Technology Review. Ortega has been interviewed by Thinking Allowed at BBC Radio 4.

Ortega obtained his PhD at the University of Glasgow's Adam Smith Business School under the supervision of Professor Hervé Moulin. He received the Catherine Richards prize by the UK Institute for Mathematics and its Applications in 2016. He sits in the editorial board of Palgrave Communications and has published his research in the Journal of Mathematical Economics, the Proceedings of the ACM Conference on Economics and Computation, Economics Letters and Physica A: Statistical Mechanics and its Applications.
