= Pairwise comparison =

Pairwise comparison may refer to:

- Pairwise comparison (psychology)
- Round-robin voting
