= Round-robin voting =

Voting systems using paired comparisons

Round-robin, paired comparison, or tournament voting methods, are a set of ranked voting systems that choose winners by comparing every pair of candidates one-on-one, similar to a round-robin tournament. In each paired matchup, the total number of voters who prefer each candidate is recorded in a beats matrix. Then, a majority-preferred (Condorcet) candidate is elected, if one exists. Otherwise, if there is a cyclic tie, the candidate "closest" to being a Condorcet winner is elected, based on the recorded beats matrix. How "closest" is defined varies by method.

Round-robin methods are one of the four major categories of single-winner electoral methods, along with multi-stage methods (like RCV-IRV), positional methods (like plurality and Borda), and rated methods (like score and STAR voting).

Most, but not all, election methods meeting the Condorcet criterion are based on pairwise counting.

== Pairwise counting ==
In round-robin voting, each voter ranks candidates from first to last (or rates them on a scale). For each pair of candidates (as in a round-robin tournament), we count how many votes rank each candidate over the other.

=== Beats matrix ===
Pairwise counts are often displayed in a beats, tournament, pairwise comparison, or outranking matrix such as those below. In these matrices, each row represents each candidate as a 'runner', while each column represents each candidate as an 'opponent'. The cells at the intersection of rows and columns each show the result of a particular pairwise comparison. Cells comparing a candidate to themselves are left blank.

Imagine there is an election between four candidates: A, B, C and D. The first matrix below records the preferences expressed on a single ballot paper, in which the voter's preferences are B > C > A > D; that is, the voter ranked B first, C second, A third, and D fourth. In the matrix a '1' indicates that the runner is preferred over the opponent, while a '0' indicates that the opponent is preferred over the runner.

Opponent Runner	A	B	C	D
A	—	0	0	1
B	1	—	1	1
C	1	0	—	1
D	0	0	0	—

In this matrix the number in each cell indicates either the number of votes for runner over opponent (runner,opponent) or the number of votes for opponent over runner (opponent, runner).

If pairwise counting is used in an election that has three candidates named A, B, and C, the following pairwise counts are produced:

- A vs. B
- A vs. C
- B vs. C

If the number of voters who have no preference between two candidates is not supplied, it can be calculated using the supplied numbers. Specifically, start with the total number of voters in the election, then subtract the number of voters who prefer the first over the second, and then subtract the number of voters who prefer the second over the first.

The pairwise comparison matrix for these comparisons is shown below.

Pairwise counts
	A	B	C
A		A > B	A > C
B	B > A		B > C
C	C > A	C > B	

A candidate cannot be pairwise compared to itself (for example candidate A can't be compared to candidate A), so the cell that indicates this comparison is either empty or contains a 0.

Each ballot can be transformed into this style of matrix, and then added to all other ballot matrices using matrix addition. The resulting sum of all ballots in an election is called the sum matrix, and it summarizes all the voter preferences.

An election counting method can use the sum matrix to identify the winner of the election.

Suppose that this imaginary election has two additional voters, and their preferences are D > A > C > B and A > C > B > D. Added to the first voter, these ballots yield the following sum matrix:

Opponent Runner	A	B	C	D
A	—	2	2	2
B	1	—	1	2
C	1	2	—	2
D	1	1	1	—

In the sum matrix above, A is the Condorcet winner, because they beat every other candidate one-on-one. When there is no Condorcet winner, ranked-robin methods such as ranked pairs use the information contained in the sum matrix to choose a winner.

The first matrix above, which represents a single ballot, is inversely symmetric: (runner,opponent) is ¬(opponent,runner). Or $(runner, opponent) + (opponent, runner) = 1$. The sum matrix has the property: $(runner, opponent) + (opponent, runner) =$ N for N voters, if all runners are fully ranked by each voter.

=== Number of pairwise comparisons ===
For N candidates, there are N · (N − 1) pairwise matchups, assuming it is necessary to keep track of tied ranks. When working with margins, only half of these are necessary because storing both candidates' percentages becomes redundant. For example, for 3 candidates there are 6 pairwise comparisons (and 3 pairwise margins), for 4 candidates there are 12 pairwise comparisons, and for 5 candidates there are 20 pairwise comparisons.

== Example ==

42% of voters	26% of voters	15% of voters	17% of voters
1. Memphis; 2. Nashville; 3. Chattanooga; 4. Knoxville	1. Nashville; 2. Chattanooga; 3. Knoxville; 4. Memphis	1. Chattanooga; 2. Knoxville; 3. Nashville; 4. Memphis	1. Knoxville; 2. Chattanooga; 3. Nashville; 4. Memphis

Suppose Tennessee is holding an election on the location of its capital. The population is split between four cities, and all the voters want the capital to be as close to them as possible. The options are:

- Memphis, large but far to the west
- Nashville, medium, near the center
- Chattanooga, small and in the east
- Knoxville, small and isolated

These ranked preferences indicate which candidates the voter prefers. For example, the voters in the first column prefer Memphis as their 1st choice, Nashville as their 2nd choice, etc. As these ballot preferences are converted into pairwise counts they can be entered into a table.

The following square-grid table displays the candidates in the same order in which they appear above.

Square grid
	... over Memphis	... over Nashville	... over Chattanooga	... over Knoxville
Prefer Memphis ...	-	42%	42%	42%
Prefer Nashville ...	58%	-	68%	68%
Prefer Chattanooga ...	58%	32%	-	83%
Prefer Knoxville ...	58%	32%	17%	-

The following tally table shows another table arrangement with the same numbers.

Tally table
All possible pairs of candidates	Number of votes with indicated preference		Margin
All possible pairs of candidates	Prefer X to Y	Prefer Y to X	X − Y
X = Memphis Y = Nashville	42%	58%	-16%
X = Memphis Y = Chattanooga	42%	58%	-16%
X = Memphis Y = Knoxville	42%	58%	-16%
X = Nashville Y = Chattanooga	68%	32%	+36%
X = Nashville Y = Knoxville	68%	32%	+36%
X = Chattanooga Y = Knoxville	83%	17%	+66%
