= Adam Smith Business School =

Higher education institution in Glasgow City, Scotland

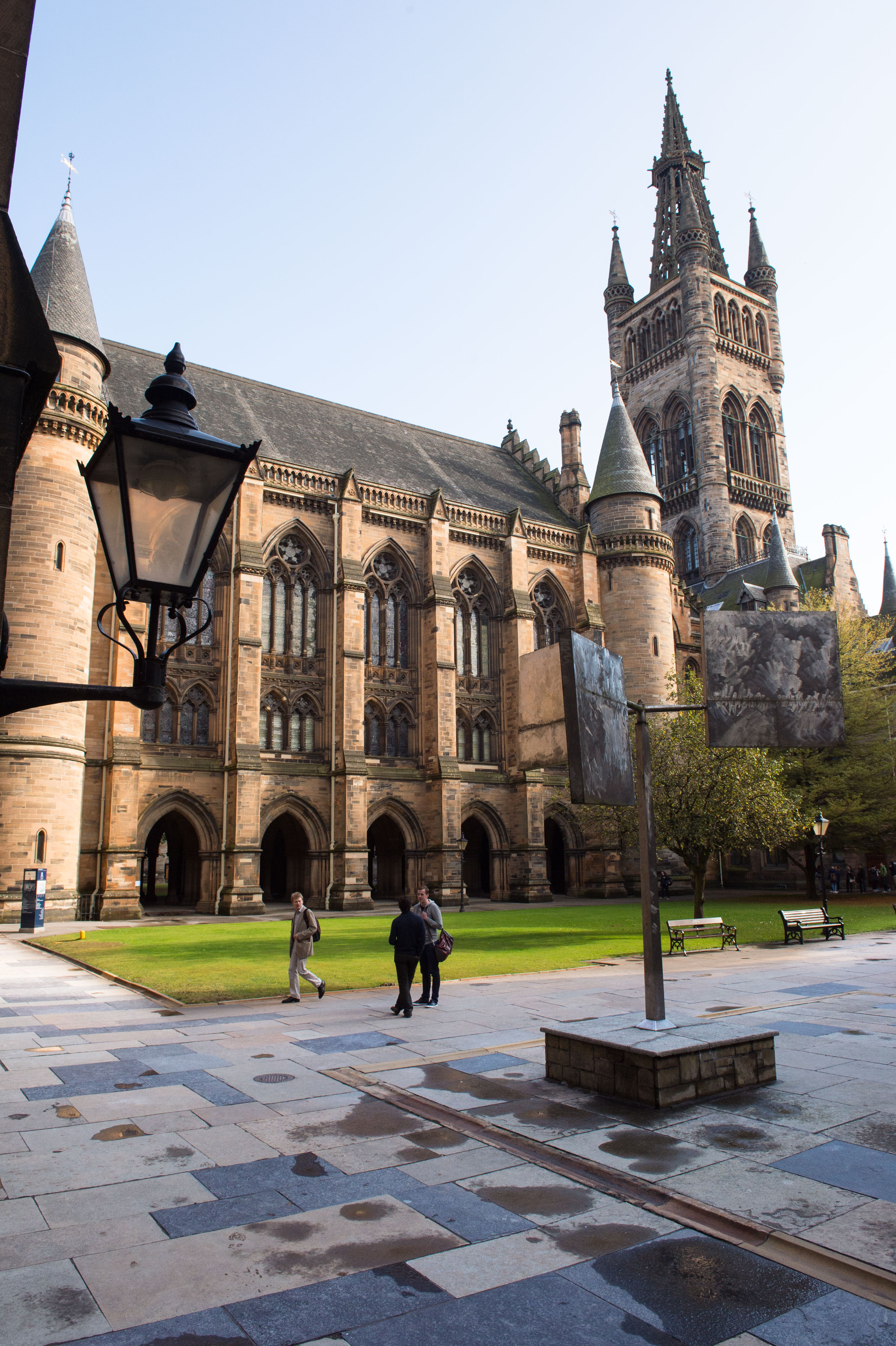
- Type: Public business school
- Established: 1986
- Parent institution: University of Glasgow
- Accreditation: AACSB, AMBA, EQUIS
- Undergraduates: 2,600 (approx)
- Postgraduates: 1,700 (approx)
- Location: Glasgow, Scotland, UK; 55.871883°N 4.289361°W
- Website: www.gla.ac.uk/schools/business/

Adam Smith Business School (formerly known as Adam Smith School of Economics and Finance) is the business school of the University of Glasgow. It is named after the father of economics, Adam Smith (1723–1790), who was Professor of Moral Philosophy at the university.

The first chair of accountancy was established within the Faculty of Law in 1925, with Bachelor of Accounting and Master of Accounting degrees being introduced in 1968. In 1971, the Scottish Business School (SBS) was established as a collaboration between the universities of Edinburgh, Glasgow and Strathclyde. The SBS launched a part-time MBA at Glasgow University in 1976. In 1978, Andrew Thomson was appointed Professor of Business Policy in Glasgow's recently established Department of Management Studies. The business school was established in 1986.

The school continues research in international finance, international economics and macroeconomics. As of 2024, the business school offered four undergraduate and 35 postgraduate degrees (including PhDs) and is one of few institutions holding triple accreditation from AACSB, AMBA and EQUIS.

To commemorate 300 years since the birth of Adam Smith in 2023, students of the school designed a school tartan which is recognised in the Scottish Register of Tartans.

The School has 11 research clusters, including: accounting; entrepreneurship, development and political economy; finance; human resource management and organisational behaviour; international business and enterprise; macroeconomics; marketing and microeconomics.

== Notable academics ==
=== Professors ===
- Anna Bogomolnaia
- Ronald MacDonald
- Hervé Moulin
