= Rolf Niedermeier =

German professor of computer science (1966–2022)

- Born: 21 July 1966; Munich
- Died: 19 March 2022 (aged 55)
- Education: Technical University of Munich; University of Tübingen
- Known for: Parameterized complexity
- Scientific career
- Fields: Computer Science
- Workplaces: Technische Universität Berlin; University of Jena; University of Tübingen
- Doctoral advisor: Klaus-Jörn Lange
- Website: www.akt.tu-berlin.de/menue/team/niedermeier_rolf/

Rolf Niedermeier (21 July 1966 – 19 March 2022) was a professor of computer science, known for his research in computational complexity theory, especially in parameterized complexity, graph theory, computational social choice, and social network analysis.

== Biography ==
Niedermeier studied computer science with mathematics at the Technical University of Munich (1991 – 1994). He received his Ph.D. in computer science from the University of Tübingen in 1996. Subsequently, he did his post-doc at the Charles University in Prague in 1998 with Jaroslav Nešetřil. In 1999 he joined the University of Tübingen, where he became the head of Emmy Noether research group (2002 – 2004). From 2004 to 2010 he was a professor of theoretical computer science at the University of Jena. Between 2010 and 2022 he led the Algorithmics and Computational Complexity group at Technische Universität Berlin. He supervised thirty doctoral students, and headed eighteen DFG-funded research projects.

== Book ==
- Niedermeier, Rolf (2006). Invitation to Fixed-Parameter Algorithms. Oxford University Press. doi:10.1093/acprof:oso/9780198566076.001.0001. ISBN 978-0-198-56607-6.
