= Sequential elimination method =

Class of voting systems

The sequential elimination methods are a class of voting systems that repeatedly eliminate the last-place finisher of another voting method until a single candidate remains. The method used to determine the loser is called the base method. Common are the two-round system, instant-runoff voting, and some primary systems.

Instant-runoff voting is a sequential loser method based on plurality voting, while Baldwin's method is a sequential loser method based on the Borda count.

== Properties ==
Proofs of criterion compliance for loser-elimination methods often use mathematical induction, and so can be easier than proving such compliance for other method types. For instance, if the base method passes the majority criterion, a sequential loser-elimination method based on it will pass mutual majority. Loser-elimination methods are also not much harder to explain than their base methods.

However, loser-elimination methods often fail monotonicity due to chaotic effects (sensitivity to initial conditions): the order in which candidates are eliminated can create erratic behavior.

If the base method passes independence from the weakest alternative, the loser-elimination method is equivalent to the base method. In other words, methods that are immune to weak spoilers are already "their own" elimination methods, because eliminating the weakest candidate does not affect the winner.

If the base method satisfies a criterion for a single candidate (e.g. the majority criterion or the Condorcet criterion), then a sequential loser method satisfies the corresponding set criterion (e.g. the mutual majority criterion or the Smith criterion), so long as eliminating a candidate can't remove another candidate from the set in question. This is because when all but one of the candidates of the set have been eliminated, the single-candidate criterion applies to the remaining candidate.

== See also ==
- Veto voting
