= Fair random assignment =

Fair division problem

Fair random assignment (also called probabilistic one-sided matching) is a kind of a fair division problem.

In an assignment problem (also called house-allocation problem or one-sided matching), there are m objects and they have to be allocated among n agents, such that each agent receives at most one object. Examples include the assignment of jobs to workers, rooms to housemates, dormitories to students, time-slots to users of a common machine, and so on.

In general, a fair assignment may be impossible to attain. For example, if Alice and Bob both prefer the eastern room to the western room, only one of them will get it and the other will be envious. In the random assignment setting, fairness is attained using a lottery. So in the simple example above, Alice and Bob will toss a fair coin and the winner will get the eastern room.

== History ==
Random assignment is mentioned already in the Bible: a lottery was used to allocate the lands of Canaan among the Tribes of Israel (Numbers 26:55).

In the US, lotteries were used to assign public lands to homesteaders (e.g. Oklahoma in 1901), and to assign radio spectra to broadcasters (e.g. FCC 1981-1993). Lottery is still used to assign green cards.

== Methods ==
There are several ways to extend the "coin toss" method to situations in which there are more than two agents, and they may have different preference relations on the objects:

- Random Priority (RP, aka Random Serial Dictatorship or RSD) is a very simple mechanism that only requires agents to have ordinal ranking on individual items. It chooses a random priority-ordering on the items and lets each agent in turn pick his favorite remaining item.
- Probabilistic Serial (PS) is another mechanism that works only with ordinal ranking on items. Agents "eat" their favorite remaining items in a constant speed, and the fraction each agent managed to eat is his/her probability to get this item.
- Competitive Equilibrium from Equal Incomes (CEEI) is a market-based mechanism: each item is viewed as a divisible commodity. Each agent is given an equal budget of a fiat currency, then the agents are allowed to trade until there is a price equilibrium. This is a more complex mechanism that requires the agents to have full cardinal utility functions (or, alternatively, ordinal ranking on lotteries).

== Properties ==
=== Efficiency ===
One desired property of a random assignment rule is Pareto efficiency (PE). There are three variants of PE:

- Ex-post PE means that, after the final allocation is determined, no other allocation is better for some agent and at least as good for the others. All three rules above (RP, PS and CEEI) are ex-post PE.
- Ex-ante PE is a stronger property, relevant for agents with cardinal utilities. It means that no other lottery is better for some agent and at least as good for the others. CEEI is ex-ante PE when agents compare lotteries based on their expected utility.
- Possible PE (or sd-PE) is an intermediate property, relevant for agents with ordinal utilities. It means that the allocation is ex-ante PE for some valuation functions consistent with the agents' ordinal ranking. PS is possible-PE, but RP is not.

For PE, the implications are: ex-ante → sd(possible) → ex-post.

=== Fairness ===
Another desired property is envy-freeness (EF). Again, there are three variants of EF:

- Ex-post EF means that, after the final allocation is determined, no agent prefers the allocation of another agent. No rule satisfies this strong property; indeed, it may be impossible to find an ex-post EF allocation of indivisible objects.
- Ex-ante EF is a weaker property, relevant for agents with cardinal utilities. It means that no agent prefers the lottery of another agent. CEEI is ex-ante EF w.r.t. expected utilities.
- Necessary EF (or sd-EF) is an intermediate property, relevant for agents with ordinal utilities. It means that the allocation is ex-ante EF (see below) for all valuation functions consistent with the agents' ordinal ranking. PS is necessary-EF, but RP is not. RP is weakly ex-ante sd-EF; it is EF when agents compare lotteries by lexicographic dominance (ld-EF).

For EF, the implication direction is opposite to that of efficiency: ex-post → sd(necessary) → ex-ante.

=== Truthfulness ===
A third desired property is truthfulness (also called strategyproofness). Again, there are three variants:

- Ex-ante truthfulness, relevant for agents with cardinal utilities, means that no agent can get a better lottery by reporting false valuations. This is a strong property, that is not satisfied by any non-trivial mechanism.
- Possible truthfulness is a weaker property, relevant for agents with ordinal utilities. It means that an agent cannot get a stochastically-dominating lottery by reporting a false ranking. This weak property is satisfied by PS when all rankings are strict, and there is at most one object per person. In this setting it is also truthful w.r.t. lexicographic dominance (ld-truthful). It is not satisfied when the rankings are weak.
- Necessary truthfulness is a stronger property, relevant for agents with ordinal utilities. It means that an agent reporting a false ranking always gets a stochastically-dominated lottery. This strong property is satisfied by RP, and it can be extended in a truthful way also to the general case when there are more objects than people.

The following table compares the various rules' properties (the RP and PS columns are based on):

	#items ≤ #agents			#items > #agents		
	RP	PS	CEEI	RP	PS	CEEI
Efficiency:	Ex-post PE	Possible PE	ex-ante PE	No	possible PE	ex-ante PE
Fairness:	Weak sd-EF; ld-EF	Necessary EF	ex-ante EF	Weak sd-EF	sd-EF	EF
Truthfulness:	Necessary truthful	Possible sd-truthful; ld-truthful _{[strict prefs]} None _{[weak prefs]}	No	sd-truthful*	No	No

=== Impossible combinations ===
Some combinations of the above three properties cannot be simultaneously satisfied by any mechanism:

- For agents with cardinal utilities, Zhou proves that no mechanism satisfies ex-ante efficiency, ex-ante truthfulness, and equal treatment of equals (= agents with identical utility functions should get the same utility).
- For agents with strict ordinal utilities, Bogomolnaia and Moulin prove that no mechanism satisfies possible efficiency, necessary truthfulness, and equal treatment of equals.
- For agents with weak ordinal utilities, Katta and Sethuraman prove that no mechanism satisfies possible efficiency, possible truthfulness, and necessary envy-freeness.

== Decomposing a fractional allocation ==
Both the PS and the CEEI rules compute a matrix of expected assignments, i.e., the marginal probabilities with which each agent receives each object. However, since the final allocation must be a matching, one must find a decomposition of this matrix into a lottery on matchings.

In the classic setting, in which m=n, this can be done using the Birkhoff algorithm. It can decompose any n-by-n matrix of agent-object probabilities into a convex combination of O(n^{2}) permutation matrices, each of which represents a matching. However, the decomposition is not unique, and some decompositions may be better than others.

Budish, Che, Kojima and Milgrom generalize Birkhoff's algorithm to arbitrary m and n. They also allow to add constraints on the assignments, under a maximal set of conditions on the set of constraints. They also present a decomposition method that minimizes the variance in the utility experienced by the agents between the different matchings.

Demeulemeester, Goossens, Hermans and Leus present a polynomial-time decomposition algorithm that maximizes the worst-case number of agents who receive an object. Their algorithm guarantees that the worst-case number of agents equals the expected number of agents rounded down, which is the best possible. They present another decomposition algorithm that maximizes the worst-case number of assigned agents while guaranteeing that all matchings in the decomposition be ex-post PE; the second algorithm can be used only for fractional assignments outputted by PS, but not those corresponding to RP. For RP, it is only possible to attain a 1/2-factor approximation to the optimal worst-case number of assigned agents. For general fractional assignments, maximizing the worst-case number of assigned agents subject to ex-post PE is NP-hard. They also present a column generation framework that can be used to optimize other worst-case criteria.

== Empirical comparison ==
Hosseini, Larson and Cohen compare RP to PS in various settings. They show that:

- When there are at most 2 objects and at most 3 agents, RP and PS return the same allocation.
- When there are at most 2 objects, for any number of agents, PS is sd-truthful and RP is sd-envy-free, and in most instances, PS dominates RP, particularly with 4 or more agents.
- When there are 3 or more objects (and 3 or more agents), RP and PS may return different allocations, and no allocation Pareto-dominates the other. For example, suppose there are three objects a,b,c and three agents with preference-rankings (1) a>c>b, (2) a>b>c, (3) b>a>c. Then, to agent (1), both RP and PS give 1/2 a + 1/2 c; to agent (2), RP gives 1/2 a + 1/6 b + 1/3 c while PS gives 1/2 a + 1/4 b + 1/4 c which is stochastically-dominant; and to agent (3), RP gives 5/6 b + 1/6 c while PS gives 3/4 b + 1/4 c which is stochastically-dominated. So (1) is indifferent, (2) strictly prefers PS and (3) strictly prefers RP.
- The fraction of preference profiles for which PS sd-dominates RP is large when the number of agents and objects differ, but approaches 0 when the numbers are equal. The same is true for ld-domination.
- When agents are risk-neutral, the expected social welfare of PS is larger than RP, but the difference is substantial only when n≠m. With RP, the fraction of envious agents is near zero when n ≥ m. PS is manipulable, and the gain from manipulation increases when m>n.
- When agents are risk-seeking, the expected social welfare of PS is larger than RP, and the difference grows rapidly when n≠m. In contrast, when n=m RP attains a higher social welfare in most cases. With RP, the fraction of envious agents is near zero when n ≥ m, but generates envy when m>n. The envy of RP decreases when risk-seekingness increases. The gain from manipulating PS decreases when agents are more risk-seeking.
- When agents are risk-averse, the social welfare gap between RP and PS becomes smaller (though still statistically-significant). The fraction of envious agents in RP increases, but the envy remains below 0.01 when n ≥ m. The manipulability of PS goes to 1 when m/n grows.

== Extensions ==
Tao and Cole study the existence of PE and EF random allocations when the utilities are non-linear (can have complements).

Yilmaz studies the random assignment problem where agents have endowments.

Shen, Wang, Zhu, Fain and Munagala study the random assignment problem when agents have priorities (agents with higher priorities should get their preferred goods before agents with lower priorities), but the priorities are uncertain.

Duddy studies egalitarian random assignment.

== See also ==
- Rental harmony is a variant of the assignment problem in which fairness is attained using monetary payments, instead of randomization.
- Fair item allocation is a setting in which agents may get more than one item.
- Sortition - random selection of political officials.
- Random two-sided matching - mainly used for sports tournaments.
