= Stochastic dominance =

Partial order between random variables

Stochastic dominance is a partial order between random variables. It is a form of stochastic ordering. The concept is motivated in decision theory and decision analysis as follows. By standard decision theory, a decision-maker has a utility function $U(x)$ that encodes their preferences, and if the decision-maker needs to pick between several gambles, each gamble's outcome is a probability distribution over possible outcomes (also known as prospects), and can be written as $X_0, X_1, \dots$. Then, the decision maker should rationally pick the $X_i$ that maximizes $\mathbb E[U(X_i)]$.

In more general cases, however, the decision-maker's utility function may be not exactly known, so the above procedure cannot take place. Nevertheless, if we know some partial details about the utility function, then this may be enough to conclude something of the form "any utility function $U$ that satisfies the given constraint must satisfy $\mathbb E[U(X_i)] \geq \mathbb E[U(X_j)]$". In this case, we say that $X_i$ "stochastically dominates" $X_j$. Risk aversion is a factor only in second order stochastic dominance.

Stochastic dominance does not give a total order, but rather only a partial order. For some pairs of gambles, neither one stochastically dominates the other, since different members of the broad class of decision-makers will differ regarding which gamble is preferable without them generally being considered to be equally attractive.

Throughout the article, $\rho, \nu$ stand for probability distributions on $\R$, while $A, B, X, Y, Z$ stand for particular random variables on $\R$. The notation $X \sim \rho$ means that $X$ has distribution $\rho$.

There are a sequence of stochastic dominance orderings, from zeroth $\succeq_0$, to first $\succeq_1$, to second $\succeq_2$, to higher orders $\succeq_n$, each one strictly more inclusive than the previous one. That is, if $\rho\succeq_n \nu$, then $\rho\succeq_{k} \nu$ for all $k \geq n$. Further, there exists $\rho, \nu$ such that $\rho\succeq_{n+1} \nu$ but not $\rho\succeq_n \nu$. Each level of stochastic dominance corresponds to stronger assumptions about the decision-maker's utility function. The stronger these assumptions, the more pairs of gambles can be ranked.

Stochastic dominance could trace back to (Blackwell, 1953), but it was not developed until 1969–1970.

== Statewise dominance (Zeroth-order) ==
The simplest case of stochastic dominance is statewise dominance (also known as state-by-state dominance). The idea is that anyone who prefers more to less (i.e. has monotonically increasing preferences) will always (weakly) prefer a statewise dominant gamble. It is defined as

Random variable $A$ is statewise dominant over random variable $B$ if $A$ gives at least as good a result in every state (every possible set of outcomes).

In symbols, $P(A \geq B) = 1$. This is written as $A \succeq_0 B$.

For strict statewise dominance, an extra condition is needed: $A$ gives a strictly better result in at least one state. In symbols, $P(A \geq B) = 1$ and $P(A > B) > 0$. This is written as $A \succ_0 B$.

Similarly, if $P(A = B) = 1$, then both $A \succeq_0 B$ and $B \succeq_0 A$, so $A \sim_0 B$, and they are equivalent in the sense of statewise dominance.

For example, if a dollar is added to one or more prizes in a lottery, the new lottery statewise dominates the old one because it yields a better payout regardless of the specific numbers realized by the lottery. Similarly, if a risk insurance policy has a lower premium and a better coverage than another policy, then with or without damage, the outcome is better.

== First-order ==
$F_{B \sim N(0, 1)}(x) \geq F_{A \sim N(0.75, 1)}(x) \forall x$ $\implies B(black) \leq A (red)$

$F_{X\sim N(0, 1)}$ und $F_{ Y \sim N(0.25, 1.5)}$, X and Y are not comparable through first-order stochastic dominance.

Statewise dominance implies first-order stochastic dominance (FSD), which is defined as:

Random variable A has first-order stochastic dominance over random variable B if for any outcome x, A gives at least as high a probability of receiving at least x as does B, and for some x, A gives a higher probability of receiving at least x. In notation form, $P [A \ge x]\ge P [B \ge x]$ for all x.

This is written as $A \succeq_1 B$. Similarly to the case of zeroth-order, $A \succ_1 B$ requires the extra condition: for some x, $P[A \ge x]>P[B \ge x]$.

In terms of the cumulative distribution functions, $A \succeq_1 B$ means that $F_A(x) \le F_B(x)$ for all x. $A \succ_1 B$ requires the extra condition: $F_A(x) < F_B(x)$ for some $x$.

If $A, B$ are comparable according to first-order dominance, then $\forall x, F_A(x) \le F_B(x)$ or $\forall x, F_A(x) \ge F_B(x)$. In both cases, we say that "the distributions of $A$ and $B$ do not intersect".

When $A, B$ are comparable according to $\succeq_1$, Wilcoxon rank-sum test tests for first-order stochastic dominance.

=== Equivalent definitions ===
Let $\rho, \nu$ be two probability distributions on $\R$, such that $\mathbb E_{X\sim \rho}[|X|], \mathbb E_{X\sim \nu}[|X|]$ are both finite, then the following conditions are equivalent, thus they may all serve as the definition of first-order (weak) stochastic dominance:

- For any $u: \R \to \R$ that is non-decreasing, $\mathbb E_{X\sim \rho}[u(X)] \geq \mathbb E_{X\sim \nu}[u(X)]$.
- $F_\rho(t) \leq F_\nu(t), \quad \forall t \in \R.$
- There exists three random variables $X\sim \rho, Y \sim \nu, \delta$, such that $X = Y + \delta$, and $\delta \geq 0$.

For strict first-order stochastic dominance, add a non-equality in the definition, as usual.

The first definition states that a gamble $\rho$ first-order stochastically dominates gamble $\nu$ if and only if every expected utility maximizer with an increasing utility function prefers gamble $\rho$ over gamble $\nu$.

The third definition is equivalent to the second. The third definition states that we can construct a pair of gambles $X, Y$ with distributions $\rho, \nu$, such that gamble $X$ always pays at least as much as gamble $Y$. More concretely, construct first a uniformly distributed $Z\sim\mathrm{Uniform}(0, 1)$, then use the inverse transform sampling to get $X = F_X^{-1}(Z), Y = F_Y^{-1}(Z)$, then $X \geq Y$ for any $Z$. This then implies the second definition. The argument can be run backwards to show that the second definition implies the third.

=== Extended example ===
Consider three gambles over a single toss of a fair six-sided die:

$$\begin{array}{rcccccc}
\text{State (die result)} & 1 & 2 & 3 & 4 & 5 & 6 \\
\hline
\text{gamble A wins }\$ & 1 & 1 & 2 & 2 & 2 & 2 \\
\text{gamble B wins }\$ & 1 & 1 & 1 & 2 & 2 & 2 \\
\text{gamble C wins }\$ & 3 & 3 & 3 & 1 & 1 & 1 \\
\hline
\end{array}$$

Gamble A statewise dominates gamble B because A gives at least as good a yield in all possible states (outcomes of the die roll) and gives a strictly better yield in one of them (state 3). Since A statewise dominates B, it also first-order dominates B.

Gamble C does not statewise dominate B because B gives a better yield in states 4 through 6, but C first-order stochastically dominates B because Pr(B ≥ 1) = Pr(C ≥ 1) = 1, Pr(B ≥ 2) = Pr(C ≥ 2) = 3/6, and Pr(B ≥ 3) = 0 while Pr(C ≥ 3) = 3/6 > Pr(B ≥ 3).

Gambles A and C cannot be ordered relative to each other on the basis of first-order stochastic dominance because Pr(A ≥ 2) = 4/6 > Pr(C ≥ 2) = 3/6 while on the other hand Pr(C ≥ 3) = 3/6 > Pr(A ≥ 3) = 0.

In general, although when one gamble first-order stochastically dominates a second gamble, the expected value of the payoff under the first will be greater than the expected value of the payoff under the second, the converse is not true: one cannot order lotteries with regard to stochastic dominance simply by comparing the means of their probability distributions. For instance, in the above example C has a higher mean (2) than does A (5/3), yet C does not first-order dominate A.

== Second-order ==
The other commonly used type of stochastic dominance is second-order stochastic dominance. Roughly speaking, for two gambles $\rho$ and $\nu$, gamble $\rho$ has second-order stochastic dominance over gamble $\nu$ if the former is more predictable (i.e. involves less risk) and has at least as high a mean. All risk-averse expected-utility maximizers (that is, those with increasing and concave utility functions) prefer a second-order stochastically dominant gamble to a dominated one. Second-order dominance describes the shared preferences of a smaller class of decision-makers (those for whom more is better and who are averse to risk, rather than all those for whom more is better) than does first-order dominance.

In terms of cumulative distribution functions $F_\rho$ and $F_\nu$, $\rho$ is second-order stochastically dominant over $\nu$ if and only if $\int_{-\infty}^x [F_\nu(t) - F_\rho(t)] \, dt \geq 0$ for all $x$, with strict inequality at some $x$. Equivalently, $\rho$ dominates $\nu$ in the second order if and only if $\mathbb E_{X\sim \rho}[u(X)] \geq \mathbb E_{X\sim \nu}[u(X)]$ for all nondecreasing and concave utility functions $u(x)$.

Second-order stochastic dominance can also be expressed as follows: Gamble $\rho$ second-order stochastically dominates $\nu$ if and only if there exist some gambles $y$ and $z$ such that $x_\nu \overset {d}{=} (x_\rho + y + z)$, with $y$ always less than or equal to zero, and with $\mathbb E(z\mid x_\rho+y)=0$ for all values of $x_\rho+y$. Here the introduction of random variable $y$ makes $\nu$ first-order stochastically dominated by $\rho$ (making $\nu$ disliked by those with an increasing utility function), and the introduction of random variable $z$ introduces a mean-preserving spread in $\nu$ which is disliked by those with concave utility. Note that if $\rho$ and $\nu$ have the same mean (so that the random variable $y$ degenerates to the fixed number 0), then $\nu$ is a mean-preserving spread of $\rho$.

=== Equivalent definitions ===
Let $\rho, \nu$ be two probability distributions on $\R$, such that $\mathbb E_{X\sim \rho}[|X|], \mathbb E_{X\sim \nu}[|X|]$ are both finite, then the following conditions are equivalent, thus they may all serve as the definition of second-order stochastic dominance:

- For any $u: \R \to \R$ that is non-decreasing, and (not necessarily strictly) concave,$\mathbb E_{X\sim \rho}[u(X)] \geq \mathbb E_{X\sim \nu}[u(X)]$
- $\int_{-\infty}^t F_\rho(x) dx \leq \int_{-\infty}^t F_\nu(x) dx, \quad \forall t \in \R.$
- There exists two random variables $X\sim \rho, Y \sim \nu$, such that $Y = X - \delta + \epsilon$, where $\delta \geq 0$ and $\mathbb E[\epsilon| X -\delta] = 0$.

These are analogous with the equivalent definitions of first-order stochastic dominance, given above.

=== Sufficient conditions ===
- First-order stochastic dominance of A over B is a sufficient condition for second-order dominance of A over B.
- If B is a mean-preserving spread of A, then A second-order stochastically dominates B.

=== Necessary conditions ===
- $\mathbb E_\rho(x) \geq \mathbb E_\nu(x)$ is a necessary condition for $\rho$ to second-order stochastically dominate $\nu$.
- $\min_\rho(x)\geq \min_\nu(x)$ is a necessary condition for $\rho$ to second-order dominate $\nu$. The condition implies that the left tail of $F_\nu$ must be thicker than the left tail of $F_\rho$.

== Third-order ==
Let $F_\rho$ and $F_\nu$ be the cumulative distribution functions of two distinct investments $\rho$ and $\nu$. $\rho$ dominates $\nu$ in the third order if and only if both

- $\int_{-\infty}^x \left(\int_{-\infty}^z [F_\nu(t) - F_\rho(t)] \, dt\right) dz \geq 0 \text{ for all } x,$
- $\mathbb E_\rho(x) \geq \mathbb E_\nu(x)$.

Equivalently, $\rho$ dominates $\nu$ in the third order if and only if $\mathbb E_\rho U(x) \geq \mathbb E_\nu U(x)$ for all $U\in D_3$.

The set $D_3$ has two equivalent definitions:

- the set of nondecreasing, concave utility functions that are positively skewed (that is, have a nonnegative third derivative throughout).
- the set of nondecreasing, concave utility functions, such that for any random variable $Z$, the risk-premium function $\pi_u(x, Z)$ is a monotonically nonincreasing function of $x$.

Here, $\pi_u(x, Z)$ is defined as the solution to the problem
$$u(x + \mathbb E[Z] - \pi) = \mathbb E [u(x + Z)].$$
See more details at risk premium page.

=== Sufficient condition ===
- Second-order dominance is a sufficient condition.

=== Necessary conditions ===
- $\mathbb E_\rho(\log(x))\geq \mathbb E_\nu(\log(x))$ is a necessary condition. The condition implies that the geometric mean of $\rho$ must be greater than or equal to the geometric mean of $\nu$.
- $\min_\rho(x)\geq\min_\nu(x)$ is a necessary condition. The condition implies that the left tail of $F_\nu$ must be thicker than the left tail of $F_\rho$.

== Higher-order ==
Higher orders of stochastic dominance have also been analyzed, as have generalizations of the dual relationship between stochastic dominance orderings and classes of preference functions. Arguably the most powerful dominance criterion relies on the accepted economic assumption of decreasing absolute risk aversion. This involves several analytical challenges and a research effort is on its way to address those.

Formally, the n-th-order stochastic dominance is defined as

- For any probability distribution $\rho$ on $[0, \infty)$, define the functions inductively:

$$F^1_\rho(t) = F_\rho(t), \quad F^2_\rho(t) = \int_0^t F^1_\rho(x)dx, \quad \cdots$$

- For any two probability distributions $\rho, \nu$ on $[0, \infty)$, non-strict and strict n-th-order stochastic dominance is defined as
  $$\rho \succeq_n \nu \quad \text{ iff } \quad F^n_\rho \leq F^n_\nu \text { on } [0, \infty)$$
  $$\rho \succ_n \nu \quad \text{ iff } \quad\rho \succeq_n \nu \text{ and } \rho \neq \nu$$

These relations are transitive and increasingly more inclusive. That is, if $\rho \succeq_n \nu$, then $\rho \succeq_{k} \nu$ for all $k \geq n$. Further, there exists $\rho, \nu$ such that $\rho \succeq_{n+1} \nu$ but not $\rho \succeq_n \nu$.

Define the n-th moment by $\mu_k(\rho) = \mathbb E_{X\sim \rho}[X^k] = \int x^k dF_\rho(x)$, then

Theorem—If $\rho \succ_n \nu$ are on $[0, \infty)$ with finite moments $\mu_k(\rho), \mu_k(\nu)$ for all $k = 1, 2, ..., n$, then $(\mu_1(\rho), \ldots, \mu_n(\rho))\succ^*_n (\mu_1(\nu), \ldots, \mu_n(\nu))$.

Here, the partial ordering $\succ^*_n$ is defined on $\mathbb R^n$ by $v \succ^*_n w$ iff $v \neq w$, and, letting $k$ be the smallest such that $v_k \neq w_k$, we have $(-1)^{k-1} v_k > (-1)^{k-1} w_k$

== Constraints ==
Stochastic dominance relations may be used as constraints in problems of mathematical optimization, in particular stochastic programming. In a problem of maximizing a real functional $f(X)$ over random variables $X$ in a set $X_0$ we may additionally require that $X$ stochastically dominates a fixed random benchmark $B$. In these problems, utility functions play the role of Lagrange multipliers associated with stochastic dominance constraints. Under appropriate conditions, the solution of the problem is also a (possibly local) solution of the problem to maximize $f(X) + \mathbb E[u(X) - u(B)]$ over $X$ in $X_0$, where $u(x)$ is a certain utility function. If the first order stochastic dominance constraint is employed, the utility function $u(x)$ is nondecreasing; if the second order stochastic dominance constraint is used, $u(x)$ is nondecreasing and concave. A system of linear equations can test whether a given solution is efficient for any such utility function. Third-order stochastic dominance constraints can be dealt with using convex quadratically constrained programming (QCP).

== See also ==
- Modern portfolio theory
- Marginal conditional stochastic dominance
- Responsive set extension - equivalent to stochastic dominance in the context of preference relations.
- Quantum catalyst
- Ordinal Pareto efficiency
- Lexicographic dominance
