= Succinct game =

Game in algorithmic game theory

Consider a game of three players, I,II and III, facing, respectively, the strategies {T,B}, {L,R}, and {l,r}. Without further constraints, 3*2^{3}=24 utility values would be required to describe such a game.
	L, l	L, r	R, l	R, r
T	4, 6, 2	5, 5, 5	8, 1, 7	1, 4, 9
B	8, 6, 6	7, 4, 7	9, 6, 5	0, 3, 0
For each strategy profile, the utility of the first player is listed first (red), and is followed by the utilities of the second player (green) and the third player (blue).

In algorithmic game theory, a succinct game or a succinctly representable game is a game which may be represented in a size much smaller than its normal form representation. Without placing constraints on player utilities, describing a game of $n$ players, each facing $s$ strategies, requires listing $ns^n$ utility values. Even trivial algorithms are capable of finding a Nash equilibrium in a time polynomial in the length of such a large input. A succinct game is of polynomial type if in a game represented by a string of length n the number of players, as well as the number of strategies of each player, is bounded by a polynomial in n (a formal definition, describing succinct games as a computational problem, is given by Papadimitriou & Roughgarden 2008).

== Types of succinct games ==
=== Graphical games ===
Say that each player's utility depends only on his own action and the action of one other player - for instance, I depends on II, II on III and III on I. Representing such a game would require only three 2x2 utility tables, containing in all only 12 utility values.

	L	R
T	9	8
B	3	4

	l	r
L	6	8
R	1	3

	T	B
l	4	4
r	5	7

Graphical games are games in which the utilities of each player depends on the actions of very few other players. If $d$ is the greatest number of players by whose actions any single player is affected (that is, it is the indegree of the game graph), the number of utility values needed to describe the game is $ns^{d+1}$, which, for a small $d$ is a considerable improvement.

It has been shown that any normal form game is reducible to a graphical game with all degrees bounded by three and with two strategies for each player. Unlike normal form games, the problem of finding a pure Nash equilibrium in graphical games (if one exists) is NP-complete. The problem of finding a (possibly mixed) Nash equilibrium in a graphical game is PPAD-complete. Finding a correlated equilibrium of a graphical game can be done in polynomial time, and for a graph with a bounded treewidth, this is also true for finding an optimal correlated equilibrium.

=== Sparse games ===
When most of the utilities are 0, as below, it is easy to come up with a succinct representation.
	L, l	L, r	R, l	R, r
T	0, 0, 0	2, 0, 1	0, 0, 0	0, 7, 0
B	0, 0, 0	0, 0, 0	2, 0, 3	0, 0, 0

Sparse games are those where most of the utilities are zero. Graphical games may be seen as a special case of sparse games.

For a two player game, a sparse game may be defined as a game in which each row and column of the two payoff (utility) matrices has at most a constant number of non-zero entries. It has been shown that finding a Nash equilibrium in such a sparse game is PPAD-hard, and that there does not exist a fully polynomial-time approximation scheme unless PPAD is in P.

=== Symmetric games ===
Suppose all three players are identical (we'll color them all purple), and face the strategy set {T,B}. Let #TP and #BP be the number of a player's peers who've chosen T and B, respectively. Describing this game requires only 6 utility values.

	#TP=2 #BP=0	#TP=1 #BP=1	#TP=0 #BP=2
T	5	2	2
B	1	7	2

In symmetric games all players are identical, so in evaluating the utility of a combination of strategies, all that matters is how many of the $n$ players play each of the $s$ strategies. Thus, describing such a game requires giving only $s\tbinom{n+s-2}{s-1}$ utility values.

In a symmetric game with 2 strategies there always exists a pure Nash equilibrium – although a symmetric pure Nash equilibrium may not exist. The problem of finding a pure Nash equilibrium in a symmetric game (with possibly more than two players) with a constant number of actions is in AC^{0}; however, when the number of actions grows with the number of players (even linearly) the problem is NP-complete. In any symmetric game there exists a symmetric equilibrium. Given a symmetric game of n players facing k strategies, a symmetric equilibrium may be found in polynomial time if k=$O(\log n/\log \log n)$. Finding a correlated equilibrium in symmetric games may be done in polynomial time.

=== Anonymous games ===
If players were different but did not distinguish between other players we would need to list 18 utility values to represent the game - one table such as that given for "symmetric games" above for each player.

	#TP=2 #BP=0	#TP=1 #BP=1	#TP=0 #BP=2
T	8, 8, 2	2, 9, 5	4, 1, 4
B	6, 1, 3	2, 2, 1	7, 0, 6

In anonymous games, players have different utilities but do not distinguish between other players (for instance, having to choose between "go to cinema" and "go to bar" while caring only how crowded will each place be, not who'll they meet there). In such a game a player's utility again depends on how many of his peers choose which strategy, and his own, so $sn\tbinom{n+s-2}{s-1}$ utility values are required.

If the number of actions grows with the number of players, finding a pure Nash equilibrium in an anonymous game is NP-hard. An optimal correlated equilibrium of an anonymous game may be found in polynomial time. When the number of strategies is 2, there is a known PTAS for finding an ε-approximate Nash equilibrium.

=== Polymatrix games ===
If the game in question was a polymatrix game, describing it would require 24 utility values. For simplicity, let us examine only the utilities of player I (we would need two more such tables for each of the other players).

	L	R
T	4, 6	8, 7
B	3, 7	9, 1

	l	r
T	7, 7	1, 6
B	8, 6	6, 4

	l	r
L	2, 9	3, 3
R	2, 4	1, 5

If strategy profile (B,R,l) was chosen, player I's utility would be 9+8=17, player II's utility would be 1+2=3, and player III's utility would be 6+4=10.

In a polymatrix game (also known as a multimatrix game), there is a utility matrix for every pair of players (i,j), denoting a component of player i's utility. Player i's final utility is the sum of all such components. The number of utilities values required to represent such a game is $O(n^2*s^2)$.

Polymatrix games always have at least one mixed Nash equilibrium. The problem of finding a Nash equilibrium in a polymatrix game is PPAD-complete. Moreover, the problem of finding a constant approximate Nash equilibrium in a polymatrix game is also PPAD-complete. Finding a correlated equilibrium of a polymatrix game can be done in polynomial time. Note that even if pairwise games played between players have pure Nash equilibria, the global interaction does not necessarily admit a pure Nash equilibrium (although a mixed Nash equilibrium must exist). Checking if a pure Nash equilibrium exists is a strongly NP-complete problem.

Competitive polymatrix games with only zero-sum interactions between players are a generalization of two-player zero-sum games. The Minimax theorem originally formulated for two-player games by von Neumann generalizes to zero-sum polymatrix games. Same as two-player zero-sum games, polymatrix zero-sum games have mixed Nash equilibria that can be computed in polynomial time and those equilibria coincide with correlated equilibria. But some other properties of two-player zero-sum games do not generalize. Notably, players need not have a unique value of the game and equilibrium strategies are not max-min strategies in a sense that worst-case payoffs of players are not maximized when using an equilibrium strategy. There exists an open source Python library for simulating competitive polymatrix games.

Polymatrix games which have coordination games on their edges are potential games and can be solved using a potential function method.

=== Circuit games ===
Let us now equate the players' various strategies with the Boolean values "0" and "1", and let X stand for player I's choice, Y for player II's choice and Z for player III's choice. Let us assign each player a circuit: Player I: X ∧ (Y ∨ Z); Player II: X ⊕ Y ⊕ Z Player III: X ∨ Y These describe the utility table below.
	0, 0	0, 1	1, 0	1, 1
0	0, 0, 0	0, 1, 0	0, 1, 1	0, 0, 1
1	0, 1, 1	1, 0, 1	1, 0, 1	1, 1, 1

The most flexible of way of representing a succinct game is by representing each player by a polynomial-time bounded Turing machine, which takes as its input the actions of all players and outputs the player's utility. Such a Turing machine is equivalent to a Boolean circuit, and it is this representation, known as circuit games, that we will consider.

Computing the value of a 2-player zero-sum circuit game is an EXP-complete problem, and approximating the value of such a game up to a multiplicative factor is known to be in PSPACE. Determining whether a pure Nash equilibrium exists is a $\Sigma_2^{\rm P}$-complete problem (see Polynomial hierarchy).

=== Other representations ===
Many other types of succinct game exist (many having to do with allocation of resources). Examples include congestion games, network congestion games, scheduling games, local effect games, facility location games, action-graph games, hypergraphical games and more.

== Summary of complexities of finding equilibria ==
Below is a table of some known complexity results for finding certain classes of equilibria in several game representations. "NE" stands for "Nash equilibrium", and "CE" for "correlated equilibrium". n is the number of players and s is the number of strategies each player faces (we're assuming all players face the same number of strategies). In graphical games, d is the maximum indegree of the game graph. For references, see main article text.

Representation	Size (O(...))	Pure NE	Mixed NE	CE	Optimal CE
Normal form game	$ns^n$	NP-complete	PPAD-complete	P	P
Graphical game	$ns^{d+1}$	NP-complete	PPAD-complete	P	NP-hard
Symmetric game	$s\tbinom{n+s-2}{s-1}$	NP-complete	The computation of symmetric Nash equilibrium is PPAD-hard for two players. The computation of non-symmetric Nash equilibrium for two players is NP-complete.	P	P
Anonymous game	$sn\tbinom{n+s-2}{s-1}$	NP-hard		P	P
Polymatrix game	$n^2s^2$	strongly NP-complete	PPAD-complete (polynomial for zero-sum polymatrix)	P	NP-hard
Circuit game		$\Sigma_2^{\rm P}$-complete			
Congestion game		PLS-complete		P	NP-hard
