= Glicksberg's theorem =

In the study of zero sum games, Glicksberg's theorem (also Glicksberg's existence theorem) is a result that shows certain games have a minimax value. If A and B are Hausdorff compact spaces, and K is an upper semicontinuous or lower semicontinuous function on $A\times B$, then

$$\sup_{f}\inf_{g}\iint K\,df\,dg = \inf_{g}\sup_{f}\iint K\,df\,dg$$

where f and g run over Borel probability measures on A and B.

The theorem is useful if f and g are interpreted as mixed strategies of two players in the context of a continuous game. If the payoff function K is upper semicontinuous, then the game has a value.

The continuity condition may not be dropped: see example of a game with no value.
