= Game without a value =

Concept in game theory

Game square (that is, the payoff to player I) for a game with no value, due to Sion and Wolfe. The payoff is 0 along the two diagonal lines

In the mathematical theory of games, in particular the study of zero-sum continuous games, not every game has a minimax value. This is the expected value to one of the players when both play a perfect strategy (which is to choose from a particular PDF).

This article gives an example of a zero-sum game that has no value. It is due to Sion and Wolfe.

Zero-sum games with a finite number of pure strategies are known to have a minimax value (originally proved by John von Neumann) but this is not necessarily the case if the game has an infinite set of strategies. There follows a simple example of a game with no minimax value.

The existence of such zero-sum games is interesting because many of the results of game theory become inapplicable if there is no minimax value.

== The game ==
Players I and II choose numbers $x$ and $y$ respectively, between 0 and 1. The payoff to player I is
$$K(x,y)=
\begin{cases}
-1 & \text{if } x<y<x+1/2,  \\
0 & \text{if } x=y \text{ or } y=x+1/2,\\
1 & \text{otherwise.}
\end{cases}$$
That is, after the choices are made, player II pays $K(x,y)$ to player I (so the game is zero-sum).

If the pair $(x,y)$ is interpreted as a point on the unit square, the figure shows the payoff to player I. Player I may adopt a mixed strategy, choosing a number according to a probability density function (pdf) $f$, and similarly player II chooses from a pdf $g$. Player I seeks to maximize the payoff $K(x, y)$, player II to minimize the payoff, and each player is aware of the other's objective.

== Game value ==
Sion and Wolfe show that
$$\sup_f \inf_g \iint K\,df\,dg=\frac{1}{3}$$
but
$$\inf_g \sup_f \iint K\,df\,dg=\frac{3}{7}.$$
These are the maximal and minimal expectations of the game's value of player I and II respectively.

The $\sup$ and $\inf$ respectively take the supremum and infimum over pdf's on the unit interval (actually Borel probability measures). These represent player I and player II's (mixed) strategies. Thus, player I can assure himself of a payoff of at least 3/7 if he knows player II's strategy, and player II can hold the payoff down to 1/3 if he knows player I's strategy.

There is no epsilon equilibrium for sufficiently small $\varepsilon$, specifically, if $\varepsilon < \frac{1}{2}\left(\frac{3}{7}-\frac{1}{3}\right)\simeq 0.0476$. Dasgupta and Maskin assert that the game values are achieved if player I puts probability weight only on the set $\left\{0,1/2,1\right\}$ and player II puts weight only on $\left\{1/4,1/2,1\right\}$.

Glicksberg's theorem shows that any zero-sum game with upper or lower semicontinuous payoff function has a value (in this context, an upper (lower) semicontinuous function K is one in which the set $\{P\mid K(P)<c\}$ (resp $\{P\mid K(P)>c\}$) is open for any real number c).

The payoff function of Sion and Wolfe's example is not semicontinuous. However, it may be made so by changing the value of K(x, x) and K(x, x + 1/2) (the payoff along the two discontinuities) to either +1 or −1, making the payoff upper or lower semicontinuous, respectively. If this is done, the game then has a value.

== Generalizations ==
Subsequent work by Heuer discusses a class of games in which the unit square is divided into three regions, the payoff function being constant in each of the regions.
