= Philip Wolfe (mathematician) =

American mathematician (1927–2016)

- Born: August 11, 1927; San Francisco, California, U.S.
- Died: December 29, 2016 (aged 89); Ossining, New York, U.S.
- Education: University of California, Berkeley
- Scientific career
- Thesis: I.Games of Infinite Length; II.A Nondegenerate Formulation and Simplex Solution of Linear Programming Problems (1954)
- Doctoral advisor: Edward William Barankin

Philip Starr "Phil" Wolfe (August 11, 1927 – December 29, 2016) was an American mathematician and one of the founders of convex optimization theory and mathematical programming.

== Life ==
Wolfe received his bachelor's degree, masters, and Ph.D. degrees from the University of California, Berkeley. He and his wife, Hallie, lived in Ossining, New York.

== Career ==
In 1954, he was offered an instructorship at Princeton, where he worked on generalizations of linear programming, such as quadratic programming and general non-linear programming, leading to the Frank–Wolfe algorithm in joint work with Marguerite Frank, then a visitor at Princeton. When Maurice Sion was on sabbatical at the Institute for Advanced Study, Sion and Wolfe published in 1957 an example of a zero-sum game without a minimax value. Wolfe joined RAND corporation in 1957, where he worked with George Dantzig, resulting in the now well known Dantzig–Wolfe decomposition method. In 1965, he moved to IBM's Thomas J. Watson Research Center in Yorktown Heights, New York.

== Honors and awards ==
He received the John von Neumann Theory Prize in 1992, jointly with Alan Hoffman.

== Selected publications ==
- Dantzig, George B.; Wolfe, Philip (February 1960). "Decomposition Principle for Linear Programs". Operations Research. 8 (1): 101–111. doi:10.1287/opre.8.1.101.
- Frank, M.; Wolfe, P. (1956). "An algorithm for quadratic programming". Naval Research Logistics Quarterly. 3 (1–2): 95–110. doi:10.1002/nav.3800030109.
- Held, M.; Wolfe, P.; Crowder, H. P. (1974). "Validation of subgradient optimization". Mathematical Programming. 6: 62–88. doi:10.1007/BF01580223. S2CID 206797746.
- Wolfe, P. (1959). "The Simplex Method for Quadratic Programming". Econometrica. 27 (3): 382–398. doi:10.2307/1909468. JSTOR 1909468.

== External Information ==
- INFORMS: Biography of Philip Wolfe from the Institute for Operations Research and the management Sciences
