= Maurice Sion =

Canadian American mathematician

Maurice Sion (17 October 1927, Skopje – 17 April 2018, Vancouver) was an American and Canadian mathematician, specializing in measure theory and game theory. He is known for Sion's minimax theorem.

== Biography ==
He was born in Skopje (now North Macedonia), to Ladino-speaking Sephardic Jewish parents, Max and Sarah, and spent his early years in Salonika, Greece, Izmir, Turkey and Beirut, Lebanon, before immigrating at the age of 16 with his family to New York.

Sion received from New York University his B.A. in 1947 and his M.A. in 1948. He received from the University of California, Berkeley in 1951 his Ph.D. under the supervision of Anthony Morse with thesis On the existence of functions having given partial derivatives on Whitney's curve. Sion was a member of the mathematics faculty at U.C. Berkeley until 1960, when he immigrated to Canada with his wife Emilie and his two children born in the U.S.A. (His two younger children were born in Canada.) From 1960 until he retired in 1989, Maurice Sion was a professor of mathematics at the University of British Columbia. For two academic years from 1957 to 1959 and in the autumn of 1962 he was at the Institute for Advanced Study. He wrote several books on mathematics and served for many years as the head of the University of British Columbia's mathematics department. In 1957 he was the coauthor with Philip Wolfe of a paper with an example of a zero-sum game without a minimax value. Sion was an Invited Speaker at the International Congress of Mathematicians (ICM) in 1970 in Nice and was appointed the Main Organizer for the ICM held in Vancouver in 1974. In 2012 he was elected a Fellow of the American Mathematical Society.

Sion was fluent in Spanish, Italian, French, and English.

He greatly enjoyed travelling, taking several sabbatical years abroad. His retirement was spent partly in Paris and partly in Vancouver to where he moved back permanently in 2011.

He was predeceased by his youngest child. Upon his death he was survived by his widow, three children, and six grandchildren.

== Selected publications ==
=== Articles ===
- Sion, Maurice (1960). "On uniformization of sets in topological spaces" (PDF). Trans. Amer. Math. Soc. 96 (2): 237–245. doi:10.1090/s0002-9947-1960-0131506-x.
- Sion, Maurice (1961). "Continuous images of Borel sets". Proc. Amer. Math. Soc. 12 (3): 385–391. doi:10.1090/S0002-9939-1961-0131508-X.
- with R. C. Willmott: Sion, M.; Willmott, R. C. (1966). "Hausdorff measures on abstract spaces". Trans. Amer. Math. Soc. 123 (2): 275–309. doi:10.1090/S0002-9947-1966-0200402-7.
- Sion, Maurice (1969). "Outer measures with values in a topological group". Proceedings of the London Mathematical Society. 3 (1): 89–106. doi:10.1112/plms/s3-19.1.89.

=== Books ===
- Introduction to the methods of real analysis. New York: Holt, Rinehart and Winston. 1968.
- Theory of semigroup valued measures. Berlin; New York: Springer-Verlag. 1973. ISBN 9783540378396.
