= Epsilon-equilibrium =

Situation where players have only a small incentive to change strategies

- Solution concept in game theory

Relationship
- Superset of: Nash Equilibrium

Significance
- Used for: stochastic games

In game theory, an epsilon-equilibrium, or near-Nash equilibrium, is a strategy profile that approximately satisfies the condition of Nash equilibrium. In a Nash equilibrium, no player has an incentive to change his behavior. In an approximate Nash equilibrium, this requirement is weakened to allow the possibility that a player may have a small incentive to do something different. This may still be considered an adequate solution concept, assuming for example status quo bias. This solution concept may be preferred to Nash equilibrium due to being easier to compute, or alternatively due to the possibility that in games of more than 2 players, the probabilities involved in an exact Nash equilibrium need not be rational numbers.

== Definition ==
There is more than one alternative definition.

=== The standard definition ===
Given a game and a real non-negative parameter $\varepsilon$, a strategy profile is said to be an $\varepsilon$-equilibrium if it is not possible for any player to gain more than $\varepsilon$ in expected payoff by unilaterally deviating from his strategy. Every Nash Equilibrium is equivalent to an $\varepsilon$-equilibrium where $\varepsilon = 0$.

Formally, let $G = (N, A=A_1 \times \dotsb \times A_N, u\colon A \to R^N)$ be an $N$-player game with action sets $A_i$ for each player $i$ and utility function $u$. Let $u_i (s)$ denote the payoff to player $i$ when strategy profile $s$ is played. Let $\Delta_i$ be the space of probability distributions over $A_i$. A vector of strategies $\sigma \in \Delta = \Delta_1 \times \dotsb \times \Delta_N$ is an $\varepsilon$-Nash Equilibrium for $G$ if

$u_i(\sigma)\geq u_i(\sigma_i^',\sigma_{-i})-\varepsilon$ for all $\sigma_i^' \in \Delta_i, i \in N.$

Note that the utilities of all players are normalized to [0,1], so this is actually a multiplicative approximation: the gain cannot be more than $\varepsilon$ times the highest utility.

=== Well-supported approximate equilibrium ===
The following definition imposes the stronger requirement that a player may only assign positive probability to a pure strategy $a$ if the payoff of $a$ has expected payoff at most $\varepsilon$ less than the best response payoff. Let $x_s$ be the probability that strategy profile $s$ is played. For player $p$ let $S_{-p}$ be strategy profiles of players other than $p$; for $s\in S_{-p}$ and a pure strategy $j$ of $p$ let $js$ be the strategy profile where $p$ plays $j$ and other players play $s$. Let $u_p(s)$ be the payoff to $p$ when strategy profile $s$ is used. The requirement can be expressed by the formula

$$\sum_{s\in S_{-p}}u_p(js)x_s > \varepsilon+\sum_{s\in S_{-p}}u_p(j's)x_s \Longrightarrow x^p_{j'} = 0.$$

== Results ==
The existence of a polynomial-time approximation scheme (PTAS) for ε-Nash equilibria is equivalent to the question of whether there exists one for ε-well-supported approximate Nash equilibria, but the existence of a PTAS remains an open problem. For constant values of ε, polynomial-time algorithms for approximate equilibria are known for lower values of ε than are known for well-supported approximate equilibria. For games with payoffs in the range [0,1] and ε=0.3393, ε-Nash equilibria can be computed in polynomial time. For games with payoffs in the range [0,1] and ε=2/3, ε-well-supported equilibria can be computed in polynomial time.

== Example ==
The notion of ε-equilibria is important in the theory of stochastic games of potentially infinite duration. There are simple examples of stochastic games with no Nash equilibrium but with an ε-equilibrium for any ε strictly bigger than 0.

Perhaps the simplest such example is the following variant of Matching Pennies, suggested by Everett. Player 1 hides a penny and Player 2 must guess if it is heads up or tails up. If Player 2 guesses correctly, he wins the penny from Player 1 and the game ends. If Player 2 incorrectly guesses that the penny is heads up, the game ends with payoff zero to both players. If he incorrectly guesses that it is tails up, the game repeats. If the play continues forever, the payoff to both players is zero.

Given a parameter ε > 0, any strategy profile where Player 2 guesses heads up with probability ε and tails up with probability 1 − ε (at every stage of the game, and independently from previous stages) is an ε-equilibrium for the game. The expected payoff of Player 2 in such a strategy profile is at least 1 − ε. However, it is easy to see that there is no strategy for Player 2 that can guarantee an expected payoff of exactly 1. Therefore, the game has no Nash equilibrium.

Another simple example is the finitely repeated prisoner's dilemma for T periods, where the payoff is averaged over the T periods. The only Nash equilibrium of this game is to choose Defect in each period. Now consider the two strategies tit-for-tat and grim trigger. Although neither tit-for-tat nor grim trigger are Nash equilibria for the game, both of them are $\epsilon$-equilibria for some positive $\epsilon$. The acceptable values of $\epsilon$ depend on the payoffs of the constituent game and on the number T of periods.

In economics, the concept of a pure strategy epsilon-equilibrium is used when the mixed-strategy approach is seen as unrealistic. In a pure-strategy epsilon-equilibrium, each player chooses a pure-strategy that is within epsilon of its best pure-strategy. For example, in the Bertrand–Edgeworth model, where no pure-strategy equilibrium exists, a pure-strategy epsilon equilibrium may exist.

== See also ==
- Nash equilibrium computation - discusses the general problem of computing an exact or approximate Nash equilibrium.
