= Anonymous game =

Game theory

In game theory, an anonymous game is a game in which (a) all players have the same set of possible actions; (b) the payoff of each player depends only on his own choice of strategy and the number of the other players playing each strategy, but not on the identity of these players.

A prominent example of an anonymous game is a congestion game. As an example, consider the "game" played by drivers who have to decide which road to take on their way home. The drivers want to minimize their delay, so the payoff of each driver is (minus) the amount of time he spends on the road; this is determined only by the road he chooses to take and by the number of other drivers who choose the same road, but not by their identity.
