= Minimax theorem =

Gives conditions that guarantee the max–min inequality holds with equality

In the mathematical area of game theory and of convex optimization, a minimax theorem is a theorem that claims that

$$\max_{x\in X} \min_{y\in Y} f(x,y) = \min_{y\in Y} \max_{x\in X}f(x,y)$$

under certain conditions on the sets $X$ and $Y$ and on the function $f$. It is always true that the left-hand side is at most the right-hand side (max–min inequality) but equality only holds under certain conditions identified by minimax theorems. The first theorem in this sense is von Neumann's minimax theorem about two-player zero-sum games published in 1928, which is considered the starting point of game theory. Von Neumann is quoted as saying "As far as I can see, there could be no theory of games ... without that theorem ... I thought there was nothing worth publishing until the Minimax Theorem was proved". Since then, several generalizations and alternative versions of von Neumann's original theorem have appeared in the literature.

== Bilinear functions and zero-sum games ==
Von Neumann's original theorem was motivated by game theory and applies to the case where

- $X$ and $Y$ are standard simplexes: $X = \{ (x_1, \dots, x_n) \in [0,1]^n : \sum_{i = 1}^n x_i = 1 \}$ and $Y = \{ (y_1, \dots, y_m) \in [0,1]^m : \sum_{j = 1}^m y_j = 1 \}$, and
- $f(x,y)$ is a linear function in both of its arguments (that is, $f$ is bilinear) and therefore can be written $f(x,y) = x^\mathsf{T} A y$ for a finite matrix $A \in \mathbb{R}^{n \times m}$, or equivalently as $f(x,y) = \sum_{i=1}^n\sum_{j=1}^m A_{ij}x_iy_j$.

Under these assumptions, von Neumann proved that

$$\max_{x \in X} \min_{y \in Y} x^\mathsf{T} A y = \min_{y \in Y}\max_{x \in X} x^\mathsf{T} A y.$$

In the context of two-player zero-sum games, the sets $X$ and $Y$ correspond to the strategy sets of the first and second player, respectively, which consist of lotteries over their actions (so-called mixed strategies), and their payoffs are defined by the payoff matrix $A$. The function $f(x,y)$ encodes the expected value of the payoff to the first player when the first player plays the strategy $x$ and the second player plays the strategy $y$.

== Concave-convex functions ==
The function f(x, y) = y^{2} − x^{2} is concave-convex.

Von Neumann's minimax theorem can be generalized to domains that are compact and convex, and to functions that are concave in their first argument and convex in their second argument (known as concave-convex functions). Formally, let $X \subseteq \mathbb{R}^n$ and $Y \subseteq \mathbb{R}^m$ be compact convex sets. If $f: X \times Y \rightarrow \mathbb{R}$ is a continuous function that is concave-convex, i.e.

$f(\cdot,y): X \to \mathbb{R}$ is concave for every fixed $y \in Y$, and
$f(x,\cdot): Y \to \mathbb{R}$ is convex for every fixed $x \in X$.

Then we have that

$$\max_{x\in X} \min_{y\in Y} f(x,y) = \min_{y\in Y} \max_{x\in X}f(x,y).$$

== Sion's minimax theorem ==
Sion's minimax theorem, proved by Maurice Sion at 1958, is a further generalization, relaxing convexity to quasiconvexity. It states:

Let $X$ be a convex subset of a linear topological space and let $Y$ be a compact convex subset of a linear topological space. If $f$ is a real-valued function on $X\times Y$ with

- $f(\cdot,y)$ upper semicontinuous and quasi-concave on $X$, for every fixed $y\in Y$, and
- $f(x,\cdot)$ lower semicontinuous and quasi-convex on $Y$, for every fixed $x\in X$.

Then we have that
$$\sup_{x\in X}\min_{y\in Y} f(x,y) = \min_{y\in Y}\sup_{x\in X} f(x,y).$$
An elementary proof of this theorem is given by Komiya.

== Counterexample ==
The following example shows that, without the concave-convex condition, the max-min and the min-max need not be equal. Let f(x, y) = (x − y)^{2} on the domain X = [0, 1] and Y = [0, 1]. Note that f is convex-convex but not convex-concave. Then:

- For any fixed x, min_{y}(f(x, y)) = 0, attained by y = x. Hence, max_{x}(min_{y}(f(x, y))) = 0.
- For any fixed y, max_{x}(f(x, y)) = max(y^{2}, (1 - y)^{2}), attained by x = 0 (when y ≥ 1/2) or x = 1 (when y ≤ 1/2). Hence, min_{y}(max_{x}(f(x, y))) = 1/4, attained by y = 1/2.

== See also ==
- Parthasarathy's theorem – a generalization of Von Neumann's minimax theorem
- Dual linear program can be used to prove the minimax theorem for zero-sum games.
- Yao's principle – an application of the minimax theorem to computational complexity
