= Gradient method =

In optimization, a gradient method is an algorithm to solve problems of the form

$$\min_{x\in\mathbb R^n}\; f(x)$$

with the search directions defined by the gradient of the function at the current point. Examples of gradient methods are the gradient descent and the conjugate gradient.

== See also ==
- Gradient descent
- Stochastic gradient descent
- Coordinate descent
- Frank–Wolfe algorithm
- Landweber iteration
- Random coordinate descent
- Conjugate gradient method
- Derivation of the conjugate gradient method
- Nonlinear conjugate gradient method
- Biconjugate gradient method
- Biconjugate gradient stabilized method
