= Zero-sum game =

Situation where total gains match total losses

In game theory and economic theory, zero-sum game is a mathematical representation of a situation that involves two competing entities, where the result is an advantage for one side and an equivalent loss for the other. In other words, player one's gain is equivalent to player two's loss, with the result that the net improvement in benefit of the game is zero.

If the total gains of the participants are added up, and the total losses are subtracted, they will sum to zero. Thus, cutting a cake, where taking a more significant piece reduces the amount of cake available for others as much as it increases the amount available for that taker, is a zero-sum game if all participants value each unit of cake equally. Other examples of zero-sum games in daily life include games like poker, chess, sport and bridge where one person gains and another person loses, which results in a zero-net benefit for every player. In the markets and financial instruments, futures contracts and options are zero-sum games as well. A zero-sum game is also called a strictly competitive game, while non-zero-sum games can be either competitive or non-competitive. Zero-sum games are most often solved with the minimax theorem which is closely related to linear programming duality, or with Nash equilibrium.

In contrast, positive-sum or win–win games describe a situation in which the interacting parties' aggregate gains and losses can be more than zero. Prisoner's Dilemma is a classic non-zero-sum game.

== Definition ==
	Choice 1	Choice 2
Choice 1	−A, A	B, −B
Choice 2	C, −C	−D, D
Generic zero-sum game

	Option 1	Option 2
Option 1	2, −2	−2, 2
Option 2	−2, 2	2, −2
Another example of the classic zero-sum game

The zero-sum property (if one gains, another loses) means that any result of a zero-sum situation is Pareto optimal. Generally, any game where all strategies are Pareto optimal is called a conflict game.

Zero-sum games are a specific example of constant sum games where the sum of each outcome is always zero. Such games are distributive, not integrative; the pie cannot be enlarged by good negotiation.

In situation where one decision maker's gain (or loss) does not necessarily result in the other decision makers' loss (or gain), they are referred to as non-zero-sum. Thus, a country with an excess of bananas trading with another country for their excess of apples, where both benefit from the transaction, is in a non-zero-sum situation. Other non-zero-sum games are games in which the sum of gains and losses by the players is sometimes more or less than what they began with.

The idea of Pareto optimal payoff in a zero-sum game gives rise to a generalized relative selfish rationality standard, the punishing-the-opponent standard, where both players always seek to minimize the opponent's payoff at a favourable cost to themselves rather than prefer more over less. The punishing-the-opponent standard can be used in both zero-sum games (e.g. warfare game, chess) and non-zero-sum games (e.g. pooling selection games). The player in the game has a simple enough desire to maximise the profit for them, and the opponent wishes to minimise it.

== Solution ==
For two-player finite zero-sum games, if the players are allowed to play a mixed strategy, the game always has at least one equilibrium solution. The different game theoretic solution concepts of Nash equilibrium, minimax, and maximin all give the same solution. Notice that this is not true for pure strategy.

=== Example ===
A zero-sum game (Two person)
Blue Red	A	B	C
1	−30 30	10 −10	−20 20
2	10 −10	−20 20	20 −20

A game's payoff matrix is a convenient representation. Consider these situations as an example, the two-player zero-sum game pictured at right or above.

The order of play proceeds as follows: The first player (red) chooses in secret one of the two actions 1 or 2; the second player (blue), unaware of the first player's choice, chooses in secret one of the three actions A, B or C. Then, the choices are revealed and each player's points total is affected according to the payoff for those choices.

Example: Red chooses action 2 and Blue chooses action B. When the payoff is allocated, Red gains 20 points and Blue loses 20 points.

In this example game, both players know the payoff matrix and attempt to maximize the number of their points. Red could reason as follows: "With action 2, I could lose up to 20 points and can win only 20, and with action 1 I can lose only 10 but can win up to 30, so action 1 looks a lot better." With similar reasoning, Blue would choose action C. If both players take these actions, Red will win 20 points. If Blue anticipates Red's reasoning and choice of action 1, Blue may choose action B, so as to win 10 points. If Red, in turn, anticipates this trick and goes for action 2, this wins Red 20 points.

Émile Borel and John von Neumann had the fundamental insight that probability provides a way out of this conundrum. Instead of deciding on a definite action to take, the two players assign probabilities to their respective actions, and then use a random device which, according to these probabilities, chooses an action for them. Each player computes the probabilities so as to minimize the maximum expected point-loss independent of the opponent's strategy. This leads to a linear programming problem with the optimal strategies for each player. This minimax method can compute probably optimal strategies for all two-player zero-sum games.

For the example given above, it turns out that Red should choose action 1 with probability 4/7 and action 2 with probability 3/7, and Blue should assign the probabilities 0, 4/7, and 3/7 to the three actions A, B, and C. Red will then win 20/7 points on average per game.

=== Solving ===
The Nash equilibrium for a two-player, zero-sum game can be found by solving a linear programming problem. Suppose a zero-sum game has a payoff matrix M where element M_{i,j} is the payoff obtained when the minimizing player chooses pure strategy i and the maximizing player chooses pure strategy j (i.e. the player trying to minimize the payoff chooses the row and the player trying to maximize the payoff chooses the column). Assume every element of M is positive. The game will have at least one Nash equilibrium. The Nash equilibrium can be found (Raghavan 1994, p. 740) by solving the following linear program to find a vector u:

Minimize:

$$\sum_{i} u_i$$
Subject to the constraints:

u ≥ 0
M u ≥ 1.

The first constraint says each element of the u vector must be nonnegative, and the second constraint says each element of the M u vector must be at least 1. For the resulting u vector, the inverse of the sum of its elements is the value of the game. Multiplying u by that value gives a probability vector, giving the probability that the maximizing player will choose each possible pure strategy.

If the game matrix does not have all positive elements, add a constant to every element that is large enough to make them all positive. That will increase the value of the game by that constant, and will not affect the equilibrium mixed strategies for the equilibrium.

The equilibrium mixed strategy for the minimizing player can be found by solving the dual of the given linear program. Alternatively, it can be found by using the above procedure to solve a modified payoff matrix which is the transpose and negation of M (adding a constant so it is positive), then solving the resulting game.

If all the solutions to the linear program are found, they will constitute all the Nash equilibria for the game. Conversely, any linear program can be converted into a two-player, zero-sum game by using a change of variables that puts it in the form of the above equations and thus such games are equivalent to linear programs, in general.

=== Universal solution ===
If avoiding a zero-sum game is an action choice with some probability for players, avoiding is always an equilibrium strategy for at least one player at a zero-sum game. For any two players zero-sum game where a zero-zero draw is impossible or non-credible after the play is started, such as poker, there is no Nash equilibrium strategy other than avoiding the play. Even if there is a credible zero-zero draw after a zero-sum game is started, it is not better than the avoiding strategy. In this sense, it's interesting to find reward-as-you-go in optimal choice computation shall prevail over all two players zero-sum games concerning starting the game or not.

The most common or simple example from the subfield of social psychology is the concept of "social traps". In some cases pursuing individual personal interest can enhance the collective well-being of the group, but in other situations, all parties pursuing personal interest results in mutually destructive behaviour.

Copeland's review notes that an n-player non-zero-sum game can be converted into an (n+1)-player zero-sum game, where the n+1st player, denoted the fictitious player, receives the negative of the sum of the gains of the other n-players (the global gain / loss).

=== Zero-sum three-person games ===
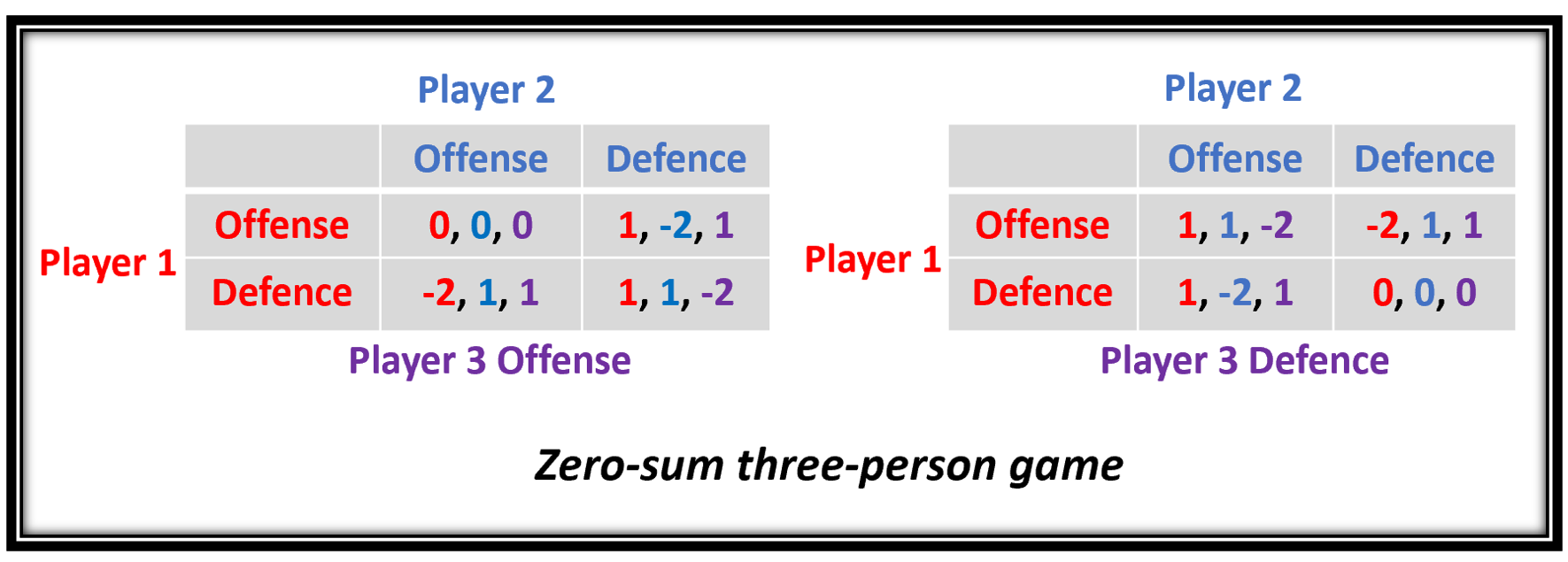
Zero-sum three-person game

It is clear that there are manifold relationships between players in a zero-sum three-person game, in a zero-sum two-person game, anything one player wins is necessarily lost by the other and vice versa; therefore, there is always an absolute antagonism of interests, and that is similar in the three-person game. A particular move of a player in a zero-sum three-person game would be assumed to be clearly beneficial to him and may disbenefits to both other players, or benefits to one and disbenefits to the other opponent. Particularly, parallelism of interests between two players makes a cooperation desirable; it may happen that a player has a choice among various policies: Get into a parallelism interest with another player by adjusting his conduct, or the opposite; that he can choose with which of other two players he prefers to build such parallelism, and to what extent. The picture on the left shows that a typical example of a zero-sum three-person game. If Player 1 chooses to defence, but Player 2 & 3 chooses to offence, both of them will gain one point. At the same time, Player 1 will lose two-point because points are taken away by other players, and it is evident that Player 2 & 3 has parallelism of interests.

=== Real life example ===
==== Economic benefits of low-cost airlines in saturated markets - net benefits or a zero-sum game ====
Studies show that the entry of low-cost airlines into the Hong Kong market brought in $671 million in revenue and resulted in an outflow of $294 million.

Therefore, the replacement effect should be considered when introducing a new model, which will lead to economic leakage and injection. Thus introducing new models requires caution. For example, if the number of new airlines departing from and arriving at the airport is the same, the economic contribution to the host city may be a zero-sum game. Because for Hong Kong, the consumption of overseas tourists in Hong Kong is income, while the consumption of Hong Kong residents in opposite cities is outflow. In addition, the introduction of new airlines can also have a negative impact on existing airlines.

Consequently, when a new aviation model is introduced, feasibility tests need to be carried out in all aspects, taking into account the economic inflow and outflow and displacement effects caused by the model.

=== Zero-sum games in financial markets ===
Derivatives trading may be considered a zero-sum game, as each dollar gained by one party in a transaction must be lost by the other, hence yielding a net transfer of wealth of zero.

An options contract - whereby a buyer purchases a derivative contract which provides them with the right to buy an underlying asset from a seller at a specified strike price before a specified expiration date – is an example of a zero-sum game. A futures contract – whereby a buyer purchases a derivative contract to buy an underlying asset from the seller for a specified price on a specified date – is also an example of a zero-sum game. This is because the fundamental principle of these contracts is that they are agreements between two parties, and any gain made by one party must be matched by a loss sustained by the other.

If the price of the underlying asset increases before the expiration date the buyer may exercise/ close the options/ futures contract. The buyers gain and corresponding sellers loss will be the difference between the strike price and value of the underlying asset at that time. Hence, the net transfer of wealth is zero.

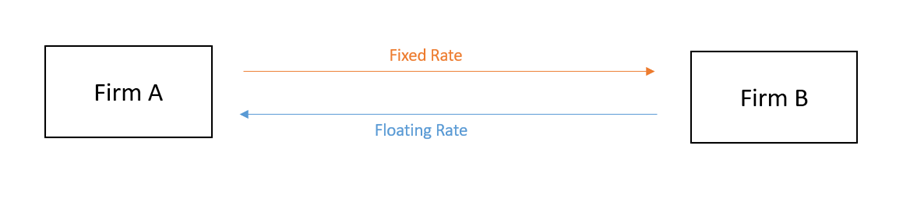

Swaps, which involve the exchange of cash flows from two different financial instruments, are also considered a zero-sum game. Consider a standard interest rate swap whereby Firm A pays a fixed rate and receives a floating rate; correspondingly Firm B pays a floating rate and receives a fixed rate. If rates increase, then Firm A will gain, and Firm B will lose by the rate differential (floating rate – fixed rate). If rates decrease, then Firm A will lose, and Firm B will gain by the rate differential (fixed rate – floating rate).

Whilst derivatives trading may be considered a zero-sum game, it is important to remember that this is not an absolute truth. The financial markets are complex and multifaceted, with a range of participants engaging in a variety of activities. While some trades may result in a simple transfer of wealth from one party to another, the market as a whole is not purely competitive, and many transactions serve important economic functions.

The stock market is an excellent example of a positive-sum game, often erroneously labelled as a zero-sum game. This is a zero-sum fallacy: the perception that one trader in the stock market may only increase the value of their holdings if another trader decreases their holdings.

The primary goal of the stock market is to match buyers and sellers, but the prevailing price is the one which equilibrates supply and demand. Stock prices generally move according to changes in future expectations, such as acquisition announcements, upside earnings surprises, or improved guidance.

For instance, if Company C announces a deal to acquire Company D, and investors believe that the acquisition will result in synergies and hence increased profitability for Company C, there will be an increased demand for Company C stock. In this scenario, all existing holders of Company C stock will enjoy gains without incurring any corresponding measurable losses to other players.

Furthermore, in the long run, the stock market is a positive-sum game. As economic growth occurs, demand increases, output increases, companies grow, and company valuations increase, leading to value creation and wealth addition in the market.

=== Complexity ===
It has been theorized by Robert Wright in his book Nonzero: The Logic of Human Destiny, that society becomes increasingly non-zero-sum as it becomes more complex, specialized, and interdependent.

== Extensions ==
=== Reducing non-zero-sum games to zero-sum games ===
In 1944, John von Neumann and Oskar Morgenstern proved that any non-zero-sum game for n players is equivalent to a zero-sum game with n + 1 players; the (n + 1)th player representing the negative of the total profit among the first n players.

=== Non-linear utilities ===
Arrow and Hurwicz studied two-player zero-sum games in which the payoff function may be non-linear (as in a concave game). They presented gradient methods for computing the value of such games.

== Misunderstandings ==
While some political strategies have been called zero sum, politics and macroeconomics in general do not have to be zero-sum due to cooperation, synergy and economic growth. Economic stagnation can contribute to zero-sum perceptions.

Applying zero-sum game logic to scenarios that are not zero-sum in nature may lead to incorrect conclusions. Zero-sum games are based on the notion that one person's win will result in the other person's loss, so naturally there is competition between the two. There are scenarios, however, where that is not the case. For instance, in win-win games both sides cooperating and working together would result in both sides benefiting more than they otherwise would have. By applying zero-sum logic, we in turn create an unnecessary, and potentially harmful, sense of scarcity and hostility. Zero-sum perceptions can result in increased support for redistribution.

The word "game" in zero-sum game does not imply the model is valid only for recreational games.

== Zero-sum thinking ==
In psychology, zero-sum thinking refers to the perception that a given situation is like a zero-sum game, where one person's gain is equal to another person's loss. The term is derived from game theory. However, unlike the game theory concept, zero-sum thinking refers to a psychological construct—a person's subjective interpretation of a situation. Zero-sum thinking is captured by the saying "your gain is my loss" (or conversely, "your loss is my gain").

== See also ==
- Bimatrix game
- Comparative advantage
- Dutch disease
- Gains from trade
- Lump of labour fallacy
- No-win situation
- Positional good
