= Sukin =

Sukin is a Russian surname associated with the old Russian noble Sukin family. Notable people with the surname include:

- Aleksandr Timofeyevich Sukin (1887—1938) Imperial Russian major general, after the Russian Revolution, chief of staff of the Orenburg Cossack Host, later worked for Soviet military intelligence
- Aleksandr Yakovlevich Sukin (1764—1837) Imperial Russian infantry general
- Boris Sukin (fl. 1542–1573), military commander and statesman of the Russian Tsardom
- Ivan Sukin (1890–1958) Russian Imperial statesman, later foreign minister in Kolchak's gonernment
- Osip Sukin (died 1669) military commander and statesman of the Russian Tsardom
- Vasily Sukin (fl 1550–1612), Russian nobleman, voivode of Siberia, founder of Tyumen
