= FL (complexity) =

In computational complexity theory, the complexity class FL is the set of function problems that can be solved by a deterministic Turing machine in a logarithmic amount of memory space. As in the definition of L, the machine reads its input from a read-only tape and writes its output to a write-only tape; the logarithmic space restriction applies only to the read/write working tape.

Loosely speaking, a function problem takes a complicated input and produces a (perhaps equally) complicated output. Function problems are distinguished from decision problems, which produce only Yes or No answers. In this way, FL is distinguished from the set L of decision problems that can be solved in deterministic logspace. FL is a subset of FP, the set of function problems that can be solved in deterministic polynomial time.

FL is known to contain several natural problems, including arithmetic on numbers. Addition, subtraction and multiplication of two numbers using logspace are fairly simple, but achieving division is a far deeper problem which was open for decades.

Similarly one may define FNL, which has the same relation with NL as FNP has with NP.
