= FL =

FL or variations may refer to:

== Businesses and organizations ==
- FL, IATA code of Fly Lili (founded 2021), a Romanian airline
- FL, IATA code of AirTran Airways (1993–2014), a former American airline
- FL Group, an Icelandic investment company
- Foot Locker (NYSE ticker symbol), retailer

== Numismatics ==
- Florin (disambiguation), various coins
- Guilder, various coins also sometimes called "florin"

== Places ==
- FL, the United States Postal Service abbreviation for the state of Florida
- FL, an abbreviation for German: Fürstentum Liechtenstein, lit. 'Principality of Liechtenstein', a country in Europe

== Science and technology ==
=== Biology and medicine ===
- Feminization laryngoplasty, gender-affirming surgery to raise the pitch of the voice
- FLT3LG (Fms-related tyrosine kinase 3 ligand), a protein
- Fluffy transcription factor, an asexual sporulation gene of Neurospora crassa
- Fluorouracil (5-FU), and leucovorin (folinic acid), a chemotherapy regimen
- Follicular lymphoma, a type of cancer
- Frontal lobe, a part of the brain

=== Mathematics and computing ===
- FL (complexity), a class of function problems
- FL (programming language), created at IBM in the 1980s
- FL Studio, music production software

=== Other uses in science and technology ===
- Femtolitre, a unit of volume
- Flerovium, symbol Fl, a chemical element (atomic number 114)
- Flight level, of an aircraft
- "Fluid", as in fluid ounce (fl oz)
- Foot-lambert, a unit of luminance
- Friedmann–Lemaître metric in cosmology

== Sport ==
- Federal League, a 1913–1915 US baseball league
- English Football League

== Genealogy ==
- Floruit (abbreviated fl.), a prefix for the time period during which someone was active

== Other uses ==
- ﬂ, a typographical ligature
- Flavius, a family or personal name in ancient Rome
- Flawless, a grade of diamond clarity
- Fork length, a standard fish measurement
- Free List (Liechtenstein), a political party
- Volvo FL, a truck
- Front Left speaker in 5.1 surround sound

== See also ==
- FLS (disambiguation)
