= FLS =

FLS may refer to:

== Places ==
- Flinders Island Airport, in Tasmania, Australia
- Fordham Law School in New York City, US
- Free Library of Springfield Township in Wyndmoor, Pennsylvania, US
- Frontline States, a former anti-apartheid organization

== Organizations ==
- Fellow of the Linnean Society
- Fiji Law Society
- Flowserve, a US industrial machinery supplier
- FLSmidth, a Danish technology company
- The Folklore Society, UK
- Forestry and Land Scotland

== Science ==
- Fibroblast-like synoviocyte, a cell type

== See also ==
- FL (disambiguation)
