= PPA (complexity) =

Complexity class

In computational complexity theory, PPA is a complexity class, standing for "Polynomial Parity Argument" (on a graph). Introduced by Christos Papadimitriou in 1994 (page 528), PPA is a subclass of TFNP. It is a class of search problems that can be shown to be total by an application of the handshaking lemma: any undirected graph that has a vertex whose degree is an odd number must have some other vertex whose degree is an odd number. This observation means that if we are given a graph and an odd-degree vertex, and we are asked to find some other odd-degree vertex, then we are searching for something that is guaranteed to exist (so, we have a total search problem).

== Definition ==
PPA is defined as follows. Suppose we have a graph on whose vertices are $n$-bit binary strings, and the graph is represented by a polynomial-sized circuit that takes a vertex as input and outputs its neighbors. (Note that this allows us to represent an exponentially-large graph on which we can efficiently perform local exploration.) Suppose furthermore that a specific vertex (say the all-zeroes vector) has an odd number of neighbors. We are required to find another odd-degree vertex. Note that this problem is in NP—given a solution it may be verified using the circuit that the solution is correct. A function computation problem belongs to PPA if it admits a polynomial-time reduction to this graph search problem. A problem is complete for the class PPA if in addition, this graph search problem is reducible to that problem.

== Related classes ==
PPAD is defined in a similar way to PPA, except that it is defined on directed graphs. PPAD is a subclass of PPA. This is because the corresponding problem that defines PPAD, known as END OF THE LINE, can be reduced (in a straightforward way) to the above search for an additional odd-degree vertex (essentially, just by ignoring the directions of the edges in END OF THE LINE).

== Examples ==
- The problem LONELY is PPA-complete: given a circuit that defines a partial matching on $\{0,1\}^n$ such that $\vec0$ is unmatched (these conditions can be syntactically enforced by manipulating the circuit), find another unmatched vertex.
- There is an un-oriented version of the Sperner lemma known to be complete for PPA.
- The consensus-halving problem is known to be complete for PPA.
- The problem of searching for a second Hamiltonian cycle on a 3-regular graph is a member of PPA, but is not known to be complete for PPA.
- There is a randomized polynomial-time reduction from the problem of integer factorization to problems complete for PPA.
