= FP (complexity) =

Complexity class

In computational complexity theory, the complexity class FP is the set of function problems that can be solved by a deterministic Turing machine in polynomial time (and for which the function problem also represents a predicate decidable in polynomial time). It is the function problem version of the decision problem class P. Roughly speaking, it is the class of functions that can be efficiently computed on classical computers without randomization.

The difference between FP and P is that problems in P have one-bit, yes/no answers, while problems in FP can have any output that can be computed in polynomial time. For example, adding two numbers is an FP problem, while determining if their sum is odd is in P. So any decision problem in P can be thought of as a function that outputs 0 or 1, so it’s trivially in FP. In short: $\mathsf P \subseteq \mathsf{FP}$.

Polynomial-time function problems are fundamental in defining polynomial-time reductions, which are used in turn to define the class of NP-complete problems.

== Formal definition ==
FP is formally defined as follows:

A binary relation $R$ is in FP if and only if

- there is a deterministic polynomial-time algorithm that, given $x$, either finds some $y$ such that $R(x,y)$ holds, or signals that no such $y$ exists,
- and there is a deterministic algorithm that, given $x$ and $y$, checks whether $R(x,y)$ holds and runs in time polynomial in the size of $x$.

(The latter condition may seem redundant, but it is added to ensure that every FP problem is in FNP, since there may be multiple $y$ values for which $R(x,y)$ holds, and without the second condition the algorithm is not required to be able to check each of these values in polynomial time.)

== Related complexity classes ==
- FNP is the set of binary relations R for which there is a deterministic algorithm that, given x and y, checks whether R(x,y) holds and runs in time polynomial in the size of x. Just as P and FP are closely related, NP is closely related to FNP. FP = FNP if and only if P = NP.
- Because a machine that uses logarithmic space has at most polynomially many configurations, FL, the set of function problems that can be calculated in logspace, is contained in FP. It is not known whether FL = FP; this is analogous to the problem of determining whether the decision classes P and L are equal.
