= Tideman alternative method =

Single-winner electoral system family

The Tideman Alternative method, also called Alternative-Smith voting, is a voting rule developed by Nicolaus Tideman which selects a single winner using ranked ballots. This method is Smith-efficient, making it a Condorcet method, and uses instant-runoff voting to resolve any cyclic ties.

== Procedure ==
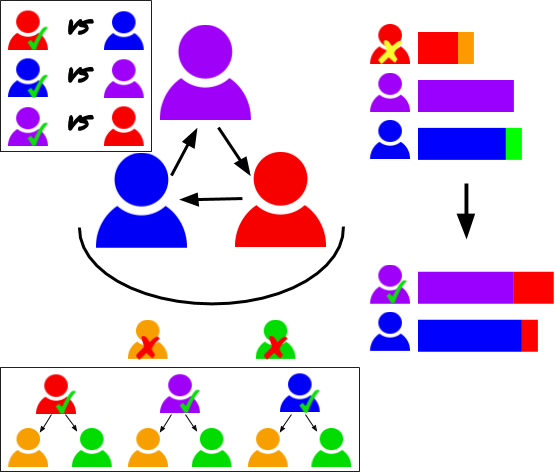
Tideman's Alternative Smith with three in the Smith set

Tideman's rule starts with all candidates and proceeds to eliminate candidates as follows, halting when only one candidate remains:

1. From the remaining candidates, eliminate all who are not in the top cycle (most often defined as the Smith set). Go to Step 2.
2. From the remaining candidates, eliminate the candidate ranked first by the fewest voters. Go to Step 1.

When a candidate is eliminated, their name is stricken from all ballots and the remaining candidates are renumbered first, second, third, etc. The procedure can also be applied using tournament sets other than the Smith set, e.g. the Landau set, Copeland set, or bipartisan set.

== Features ==
=== Strategy-resistance ===
Tideman's Alternative strongly resists both strategic nomination and strategic voting by political parties or coalitions (although like every system, it can still be manipulated in some situations). The Smith and runoff components of the system each cover the other's weaknesses:

1. Smith-efficient methods are difficult for any coalition to manipulate, because no majority-strength coalition will have an incentive to remove a Condorcet winner: if most voters prefer A to B, A can already defeat B.
  - This reasoning does not apply to situations with a Condorcet cycle, however.
  - While Condorcet cycles are rare in practice with honest voters, burial (ranking a strong rival last, below weak opponents) can often be used to manufacture a false cycle.
2. Instant runoff voting is resistant to burial, because it is only based on each voter's top preference in any given round. This means that burial strategies effective against the Smith-elimination step are not effective against the instant runoff step.
  - On the other hand, instant-runoff voting is highly vulnerable to compromising strategy, where voters are incentivized to rank "lesser evils" higher in order to defeat a "greater evil".
  - However, if a Condorcet winner exists, they're immune to compromising, so electing them reduces compromise incentive.

The combination of these two methods creates a highly strategy-resistant system.

=== Spoiler effects ===
Tideman's Alternative fails independence of irrelevant alternatives, meaning it can sometimes be affected by spoiler candidates. However, the method adheres to a weaker property that eliminates most spoilers, sometimes called independence of Smith-dominated alternatives (ISDA). This method states that if one candidate (X) wins an election, and a new alternative (Y) is added, X will still win the election as long as Y is not in the highest-ranked cycle.

=== Comparison table ===
The following table compares Tideman's Alternative with other single-winner election methods:

Comparison of single-winner voting systems
Criterion Method	Majority winner	Majority loser	Mutual majority	Condorcet winner (Note: Condorcet's criterion is incompatible with the consistency, independence of irrelevant alternatives, participation, later-no-harm, later-no-help, and sincere favorite criteria.)	Condorcet loser	Smith	Smith-IIA	IIA/LIIA	Cloneproof	Monotone	Consistency	Participation	Reversal symmetry	Homogeneity	Later-no-harm	Later-no-help	No favorite betrayal	Ballot type
Plurality	Yes	No	No	No	No	No	No	No	No	Yes	Yes	Yes	No	Yes	Yes	Yes	No	Single mark
Anti-plurality	No	Yes	No	No	No	No	No	No	No	Yes	Yes	Yes	No	Yes	No	No	Yes	Single mark
Two round system	Yes	Yes	No	No	Yes	No	No	No	No	No	No	No		Yes	Yes	Yes	No	Single mark
Instant-runoff	Yes	Yes	Yes	No	Yes	No	No	No	Yes	No	No	No	No	Yes	Yes	Yes	No	Ranking
Coombs	Yes	Yes	Yes	No	Yes	No	No	No	No	No	No	No		Yes	No	No	Yes	Ranking
Nanson	Yes	Yes	Yes	Yes	Yes	Yes	No	No	No	No	No	No	Yes		No	No	No	Ranking
Baldwin	Yes	Yes	Yes	Yes	Yes	Yes	No	No	No	No	No	No	No		No	No	No	Ranking
Tideman alternative	Yes	Yes	Yes	Yes	Yes	Yes	Yes	No	Yes	No	No	No	No		No	No	No	Ranking
Minimax	Yes	No	No	Yes (Note: A variant of Minimax that counts only pairwise opposition, not opposition minus support, fails the Condorcet criterion and meets later-no-harm.)	No	No	No	No	No	Yes	No	No	No	Yes	No	No	No	Ranking
Copeland	Yes	Yes	Yes	Yes	Yes	Yes	Yes	No	No	Yes	No	No			No	No	No	Ranking
Black	Yes	Yes	No	Yes	Yes	No	No	No	No	Yes	No	No	Yes	Yes	No	No	No	Ranking
Kemeny	Yes	Yes	Yes	Yes	Yes	Yes	Yes	LIIA Only	No	Yes	No	No	Yes	Yes	No	No	No	Ranking
Ranked pairs	Yes	Yes	Yes	Yes	Yes	Yes	Yes	LIIA Only	Yes	Yes	No	No (Note: In Highest median, Ranked Pairs, and Schulze voting, there is always a regret-free, semi-honest ballot for any voter, holding all other ballots constant and assuming they know enough about how others will vote. Under such circumstances, there is always at least one way for a voter to participate without grading any less-preferred candidate above any more-preferred one.)	Yes	Yes	No	No	No	Ranking
Schulze	Yes	Yes	Yes	Yes	Yes	Yes	Yes	No	Yes	Yes	No	No	Yes	Yes	No	No	No	Ranking
Borda	No	Yes	No	No	Yes	No	No	No	No	Yes	Yes	Yes	Yes	Yes	No	Yes	No	Ranking
Bucklin	Yes	Yes	Yes	No	No	No	No	No	No	Yes	No	No	No	Yes	No	Yes	No	Ranking
Dodgson	Yes		No	Yes	No	No		No	No	No	No	No	No	No	No	No	No	Ranking
Approval	Yes	No	No	No	No	No	Yes	Yes (Note: Approval voting, score voting, and majority judgment satisfy IIA if it is assumed that voters rate candidates independently using their own absolute scale. For this to hold, in some elections, some voters must use less than their full voting power despite having meaningful preferences among viable candidates.)	Yes	Yes	Yes	Yes	Yes	Yes	No	Yes	Yes	Approvals
Majority Judgement	No	No (Note: Majority Judgment may elect a candidate uniquely least-preferred by over half of voters, but it never elects the candidate uniquely bottom-rated by over half of voters.)	No (Note: Majority Judgment fails the mutual majority criterion, but satisfies the criterion if the majority ranks the mutually favored set above a given absolute grade and all others below that grade.)	No	No	No	Yes	Yes	Yes	Yes	No	No		Yes	No	Yes	Yes	Scores
Score	No	No	No	No	No	No	Yes	Yes	Yes	Yes	Yes	Yes	Yes	Yes	No	Yes	Yes	Scores
STAR	No	Yes	No	No	Yes	No	No	No	No	Yes	No	No	No		No	No	No	Scores
Quadratic	No	No	No	No	No	No	No	No	No	Yes	Yes	Yes			N/A	N/A	No	Credits
Random ballot (Note: A randomly chosen ballot determines winner. This and closely related methods are of mathematical interest and included here to demonstrate that even unreasonable methods can pass voting method criteria.)	No	No	No	No	No	No	Yes	Yes	Yes	Yes		Yes	No	Yes	Yes	Yes	Yes	Single mark
Sortition (Note: Where a winner is randomly chosen from the candidates, sortition is included to demonstrate that even non-voting methods can pass some criteria.)	No	No	No	No	No	No	Yes	Yes	No	Yes	N/A	Yes	N/A	N/A	Yes	Yes	Yes	None
Table Notes																		
