= Kemeny method =

Single-winner electoral system

The Kemeny method is an electoral system that uses ranked ballots and pairwise comparison counts to identify the most popular choices in an election. It is a Condorcet method because if there is a Condorcet winner, it will always be ranked as the most popular choice.

This method assigns a score for each possible sequence, where each sequence considers which choice might be most popular, which choice might be second-most popular, which choice might be third-most popular, and so on down to which choice might be least-popular. The sequence that has the highest score is the winning sequence, and the first choice in the winning sequence is the most popular choice. (As explained below, ties can occur at any ranking level.)

The Kemeny method is also known as the Kemeny-Young rule, VoteFair popularity ranking, the maximum likelihood method, and the median relation.

== Description ==
The Kemeny method uses preferential ballots on which voters rank choices according to their order of preference. A voter is allowed to rank more than one choice at the same preference level. Unranked choices are usually interpreted as least-preferred.

Kemeny calculations are usually done in two steps. The first step is to create a matrix or table that counts pairwise voter preferences. The second step is to test all possible rankings, calculate a score for each such ranking, and compare the scores. Each ranking score equals the sum of the pairwise counts that apply to that ranking.

The ranking that has the largest score is identified as the overall ranking. (If more than one ranking has the same largest score, all these possible rankings are tied, and typically the overall ranking involves one or more ties.)

Another way to view the ordering is that it is the one which minimizes the sum of the Kendall tau distances (bubble sort distance) to the voters' lists.

In order to demonstrate how an individual preference order is converted into a tally table, it is worth considering the following example. Suppose that a single voter has a choice among four candidates (i.e. Elliot, Meredith, Roland, and Selden) and has the following preference order:

Preference order	Choice
First	Elliot
Second	Roland
Third	Meredith or Selden (equal preference)

These preferences can be expressed in a tally table. A tally table, which arranges all the pairwise counts in three columns, is useful for counting (tallying) ballot preferences and calculating ranking scores. The center column tracks when a voter indicates more than one choice at the same preference level. The above preference order can be expressed as the following tally table:

All possible pairs of choice names	Number of votes with indicated preference		
All possible pairs of choice names	Prefer X over Y	Equal preference	Prefer Y over X
X = Selden; Y = Meredith	0	+1 vote	0
X = Selden; Y = Elliot	0	0	+1 vote
X = Selden; Y = Roland	0	0	+1 vote
X = Meredith; Y = Elliot	0	0	+1 vote
X = Meredith; Y = Roland	0	0	+1 vote
X = Elliot; Y = Roland	+1 vote	0	0

Now suppose that multiple voters had voted on those four candidates. After all ballots have been counted, the same type of tally table can be used to summarize all the preferences of all the voters. Here is an example for a case that has 100 voters:

All possible pairs of choice names	Number of votes with indicated preference		
All possible pairs of choice names	Prefer X over Y	Equal preference	Prefer Y over X
X = Selden; Y = Meredith	50	10	40
X = Selden; Y = Elliot	40	0	60
X = Selden; Y = Roland	40	0	60
X = Meredith; Y = Elliot	40	0	60
X = Meredith; Y = Roland	30	0	70
X = Elliot; Y = Roland	30	0	70

The sum of the counts in each row must equal the total number of votes.

After the tally table has been completed, each possible ranking of choices is examined in turn, and its ranking score is calculated by adding the appropriate number from each row of the tally table. For example, the possible ranking:

1. Elliot
2. Roland
3. Meredith
4. Selden

satisfies the preferences Elliot > Roland, Elliot > Meredith, Elliot > Selden, Roland > Meredith, Roland > Selden, and Meredith > Selden. The respective scores, taken from the table, are

- Elliot > Roland: 30
- Elliot > Meredith: 60
- Elliot > Selden: 60
- Roland > Meredith: 70
- Roland > Selden: 60
- Meredith > Selden: 40

giving a total ranking score of 30 + 60 + 60 + 70 + 60 + 40 = 320.

=== Calculating the overall ranking ===
After the scores for every possible ranking have been calculated, the ranking that has the largest score can be identified, and becomes the overall ranking. In this case, the overall ranking is:

1. Roland
2. Elliot
3. Selden
4. Meredith

with a ranking score of 370.

If there are cycles or ties, more than one possible ranking can have the same largest score. Cycles are resolved by producing a single overall ranking where some of the choices are tied.

=== Summary matrix ===
After the overall ranking has been calculated, the pairwise comparison counts can be arranged in a summary matrix, as shown below, in which the choices appear in the winning order from most popular (top and left) to least popular (bottom and right). This matrix layout does not include the equal-preference pairwise counts that appear in the tally table:

	... over **Roland**	... over **Elliot**	... over **Selden**	... over **Meredith**
Prefer **Roland** ...	-	**70**	**60**	**70**
Prefer **Elliot** ...	30	-	**60**	**60**
Prefer **Selden** ...	40	40	-	**50**
Prefer **Meredith** ...	30	40	40	-

In this summary matrix, the largest ranking score equals the sum of the counts in the upper-right, triangular half of the matrix (shown here in bold, with a green background). No other possible ranking can have a summary matrix that yields a higher sum of numbers in the upper-right, triangular half. (If it did, that would be the overall ranking.)

In this summary matrix, the sum of the numbers in the lower-left, triangular half of the matrix (shown here with a red background) are a minimum. The academic papers by John Kemeny and Peyton Young refer to finding this minimum sum, which is called the Kemeny score, and which is based on how many voters oppose (rather than support) each pairwise order:

Method	First-place winner
Kemeny	Roland
Condorcet	Roland
Instant runoff voting	Elliot or Selden (depending on how the second-round tie is handled)
Plurality	Selden

== Example ==
Tennessee voting pattern

42% of voters	26% of voters	15% of voters	17% of voters
1. **Memphis**; 2. Nashville; 3. Chattanooga; 4. Knoxville	1. **Nashville**; 2. Chattanooga; 3. Knoxville; 4. Memphis	1. **Chattanooga**; 2. Knoxville; 3. Nashville; 4. Memphis	1. **Knoxville**; 2. Chattanooga; 3. Nashville; 4. Memphis

Suppose Tennessee is holding an election on the location of its capital. The population is split between four cities, and all the voters want the capital to be as close to them as possible. The options are:

- Memphis, large but far to the west
- Nashville, medium, near the center
- Chattanooga, small and in the east
- Knoxville, small and isolated

This matrix summarizes the corresponding pairwise comparison counts:

	... over **Memphis**	... over **Nashville**	... over **Chattanooga**	... over **Knoxville**
Prefer; **Memphis** ...	-	42%	42%	42%
Prefer; **Nashville** ...	58%	-	68%	68%
Prefer; **Chattanooga** ...	58%	32%	-	83%
Prefer; **Knoxville** ...	58%	32%	17%	-

The Kemeny method arranges the pairwise comparison counts in the following tally table:

All possible pairs of choice names	Number of votes with indicated preference		
All possible pairs of choice names	Prefer X over Y	Equal preference	Prefer Y over X
X = Memphis; Y = Nashville	42%	0	58%
X = Memphis; Y = Chattanooga	42%	0	58%
X = Memphis; Y = Knoxville	42%	0	58%
X = Nashville; Y = Chattanooga	68%	0	32%
X = Nashville; Y = Knoxville	68%	0	32%
X = Chattanooga; Y = Knoxville	83%	0	17%

The ranking score for the possible ranking of Memphis first, Nashville second, Chattanooga third, and Knoxville fourth equals (the unit-less number) 345, which is the sum of the following annotated numbers.

42% (of the voters) prefer Memphis over Nashville
42% prefer Memphis over Chattanooga
42% prefer Memphis over Knoxville
68% prefer Nashville over Chattanooga
68% prefer Nashville over Knoxville
83% prefer Chattanooga over Knoxville

This table lists all the ranking scores:

First choice	Second choice	Third choice	Fourth choice	Ranking score
Memphis	Nashville	Chattanooga	Knoxville	345
Memphis	Nashville	Knoxville	Chattanooga	279
Memphis	Chattanooga	Nashville	Knoxville	309
Memphis	Chattanooga	Knoxville	Nashville	273
Memphis	Knoxville	Nashville	Chattanooga	243
Memphis	Knoxville	Chattanooga	Nashville	207
Nashville	Memphis	Chattanooga	Knoxville	361
Nashville	Memphis	Knoxville	Chattanooga	295
Nashville	Chattanooga	Memphis	Knoxville	377
**Nashville**	**Chattanooga**	**Knoxville**	**Memphis**	**393**
Nashville	Knoxville	Memphis	Chattanooga	311
Nashville	Knoxville	Chattanooga	Memphis	327
Chattanooga	Memphis	Nashville	Knoxville	325
Chattanooga	Memphis	Knoxville	Nashville	289
Chattanooga	Nashville	Memphis	Knoxville	341
Chattanooga	Nashville	Knoxville	Memphis	357
Chattanooga	Knoxville	Memphis	Nashville	305
Chattanooga	Knoxville	Nashville	Memphis	321
Knoxville	Memphis	Nashville	Chattanooga	259
Knoxville	Memphis	Chattanooga	Nashville	223
Knoxville	Nashville	Memphis	Chattanooga	275
Knoxville	Nashville	Chattanooga	Memphis	291
Knoxville	Chattanooga	Memphis	Nashville	239
Knoxville	Chattanooga	Nashville	Memphis	255

The largest ranking score is 393, and this score is associated with the following possible ranking, so this ranking is also the overall ranking:

Preference order	Choice
First	Nashville
Second	Chattanooga
Third	Knoxville
Fourth	Memphis

If a single winner is needed, the first choice, Nashville, is chosen. (In this example Nashville is the Condorcet winner.)

The summary matrix below arranges the pairwise counts in order from most popular (top and left) to least popular (bottom and right):

	... over **Nashville** ...	... over **Chattanooga** ...	... over **Knoxville** ...	... over **Memphis** ...
Prefer **Nashville** ...	-	**68%**	**68%**	**58%**
Prefer **Chattanooga** ...	32%	-	**83%**	**58%**
Prefer **Knoxville** ...	32%	17%	-	**58%**
Prefer **Memphis** ...	42%	42%	42%	-

In this arrangement the largest ranking score (393) equals the sum of the counts in bold, which are in the upper-right, triangular half of the matrix (with a green background).

== Characteristics ==
In all cases that do not result in an exact tie, the Kemeny method identifies a most-popular choice, second-most popular choice, and so on.

A tie can occur at any preference level. Except in some cases where circular ambiguities are involved, the Kemeny method only produces a tie at a preference level when the number of voters with one preference exactly matches the number of voters with the opposite preference.

=== Satisfied criteria for all Condorcet methods ===
All Condorcet methods, including the Kemeny method, satisfy these criteria:

Non-imposition
There are voter preferences that can yield every possible overall order-of-preference result, including ties at any combination of preference levels.

Condorcet criterion
If there is a choice that wins all pairwise contests, then this choice wins.

Majority criterion
If a majority of voters strictly prefer choice X to every other choice, then choice X is identified as the most popular.

Non-dictatorship
A single voter cannot control the outcome in all cases.

=== Additional satisfied criteria ===
The Kemeny method also satisfies these criteria:

Unrestricted domain
Identifies the overall order of preference for all the choices. The method does this for all possible sets of voter preferences and always produces the same result for the same set of voter preferences.

Pareto efficiency
Any pairwise preference expressed by every voter results in the preferred choice being ranked higher than the less-preferred choice.

Monotonicity
If voters increase a choice's preference level, the ranking result either does not change or the promoted choice increases in overall popularity.

Smith criterion
The most popular choice is a member of the Smith set, which is the smallest nonempty set of choices such that every member of the set is pairwise preferred to every choice not in the Smith set.

Independence of Smith-dominated alternatives
If choice X is not in the Smith set, adding or withdrawing choice X does not change a result in which choice Y is identified as most popular.

Ranking-consistency
If all the ballots are divided into separate races and the overall ranking for the separate races are the same, then the same ranking occurs when all the ballots are combined.

Reversal symmetry
If the preferences on every ballot are inverted, then the previously most popular choice must not remain the most popular choice.

=== Failed criteria for all Condorcet methods ===
In common with all Condorcet methods, the Kemeny method fails these criteria (which means the described criteria do not apply to the Kemeny method):

Independence of irrelevant alternatives
Adding or withdrawing choice X does not change a result in which choice Y is identified as most popular.

Invulnerability to burying
A voter cannot displace a choice from most popular by giving the choice an insincerely low ranking.

Invulnerability to compromising
A voter cannot cause a choice to become the most popular by giving the choice an insincerely high ranking.

Participation
Adding ballots that rank choice X over choice Y never cause choice Y, instead of choice X, to become most popular.

Later-no-harm
Ranking an additional choice (that was otherwise unranked) cannot displace a choice from being identified as the most popular.

Winner-consistency
If all the ballots are divided into separate races and choice X is identified as the most popular in every such race, then choice X is the most popular when all the ballots are combined.

Sincere favorite criterion
The optimal voting strategy for an individual should always include giving their favorite candidate maximum support.

=== Additional failed criteria ===
The Kemeny method also fails these criteria (which means the described criteria do not apply to the Kemeny method):

Independence of clones
Offering a larger number of similar choices, instead of offering only a single such choice, does not change the probability that one of these choices is identified as most popular.

Invulnerability to push-over
A voter cannot cause choice X to become the most popular by giving choice Y an insincerely high ranking.

Schwartz
The choice identified as most popular is a member of the Schwartz set.

Polynomial runtime
An algorithm is known to determine the winner using this method in a runtime that is polynomial in the number of choices.

== Calculation methods and computational complexity ==
An algorithm for computing a Kemeny ranking in time polynomial in the number of candidates is not known, and unlikely to exist since the problem is NP-hard even if there are just 4 voters (even) or 7 voters (odd).

It has been reported that calculation methods based on integer programming sometimes allowed the computation of full rankings for votes on as many as 40 candidates in seconds. However, certain 40-candidate 5-voter Kemeny elections generated at random were not solvable on a 3 GHz Pentium computer in a useful time bound in 2006.

The Kemeny method can be formulated as an instance of a more abstract problem, of finding weighted feedback arc sets in tournament graphs. As such, many methods for the computation of feedback arc sets can be applied to this problem, including a variant of the Held–Karp algorithm that can compute the Kemeny–Young ranking of $n$ candidates in time $O(n2^n)$, significantly faster for many candidates than the factorial time of testing all rankings. There exists a polynomial-time approximation scheme for computing a Kemeny ranking, and there also exists a parameterized subexponential-time algorithm with running time O^{*}(2^{O(√OPT)}) for computing such a ranking.

== History ==
The Kemeny method was developed by John Kemeny in 1959.

In 1978, Peyton Young and Arthur Levenglick axiomatically characterized the method, showing that it is the unique neutral method satisfying ranking-consistency and the so-called quasi-Condorcet criterion. It can also be characterized using consistency and a monotonicity property. In other papers, Young adopted an epistemic approach to preference aggregation: he supposed that there was an objectively 'correct', but unknown preference order over the alternatives, and voters receive noisy signals of this true preference order (cf. Condorcet's jury theorem.) Using a simple probabilistic model for these noisy signals, Young showed that the Kemeny method was the maximum likelihood estimator of the true preference order. Young further argues that Condorcet himself was aware of the Kemeny rule and its maximum-likelihood interpretation, but was unable to clearly express his ideas.

In the papers by John Kemeny and Peyton Young, the Kemeny scores use counts of how many voters oppose, rather than support, each pairwise preference, but the smallest such score identifies the same overall ranking.

Since 1991 the method has been promoted under the name "VoteFair popularity ranking" by Richard Fobes.

== Comparison table ==
The following table compares the Kemeny method with other single-winner election methods:

Comparison of single-winner voting systems
Criterion Method	Majority winner	Majority loser	Mutual majority	Condorcet winner (Note: Condorcet's criterion is incompatible with the consistency, independence of irrelevant alternatives, participation, later-no-harm, later-no-help, and sincere favorite criteria.)	Condorcet loser	Pareto	Smith	Smith-IIA	IIA/LIIA	IPDA	Cloneproof	Monotone	Consistency	Participation	Reversal symmetry	Homogeneity	Later-no-harm	Later-no-help	Sincere favorite	Ballot type
Plurality	Yes	No	No	No	No	Yes	No	No	No		No	Yes	Yes	Yes	No	Yes	Yes	Yes	No	Single mark
Anti-plurality	No	Yes	No	No	No	No	No	No	No	No	No	Yes	Yes	Yes	No	Yes	No	No	Yes	Single mark
Two round system	Yes	Yes	No	No	Yes	Yes	No	No	No		No	No	No	No		Yes	Yes	Yes	No	Single mark
Instant-runoff	Yes	Yes	Yes	No	Yes	Yes	No	No	No		Yes	No	No	No	No	Yes	Yes	Yes	No	Ranking
Coombs	Yes	Yes	Yes	No	Yes		No	No	No	No	No	No	No	No		Yes	No	No	Yes	Ranking
Nanson	Yes	Yes	Yes	Yes	Yes		Yes	No	No	No	No	No	No	No	Yes		No	No	No	Ranking
Baldwin	Yes	Yes	Yes	Yes	Yes		Yes	No	No	No	No	No	No	No	No		No	No	No	Ranking
Tideman alternative	Yes	Yes	Yes	Yes	Yes		Yes	Yes	No		Yes	No	No	No	No		No	No	No	Ranking
Minimax	Yes	No	No	Yes (Note: A variant of Minimax that counts only pairwise opposition, not opposition minus support, fails the Condorcet criterion and meets later-no-harm.)	No	Yes	No	No	No	Yes	No	Yes	No	No	No	Yes	No	No	No	Ranking
Copeland	Yes	Yes	Yes	Yes	Yes	Yes	Yes	Yes	No	No	No	Yes	No	No			No	No	No	Ranking
Black	Yes	Yes	No	Yes	Yes	Yes	No	No	No	No	No	Yes	No	No	Yes	Yes	No	No	No	Ranking
Kemeny	Yes	Yes	Yes	Yes	Yes	Yes	Yes	Yes	LIIA	No	No	Yes	No	No	Yes	Yes	No	No	No	Ranking
Ranked pairs	Yes	Yes	Yes	Yes	Yes	Yes	Yes	Yes	LIIA	No	Yes	Yes	No	No (Note: In Highest median, Ranked Pairs, and Schulze voting, there is always a regret-free, semi-honest ballot for any voter, holding all other ballots constant and assuming they know enough about how others will vote. Under such circumstances, there is always at least one way for a voter to participate without grading any less-preferred candidate above any more-preferred one.)	Yes	Yes	No	No	No	Ranking
Schulze	Yes	Yes	Yes	Yes	Yes	Yes	Yes	Yes	No	No	Yes	Yes	No	No	Yes	Yes	No	No	No	Ranking
Borda	No	Yes	No	No	Yes	Yes	No	No	No	No	No	Yes	Yes	Yes	Yes	Yes	No	Yes	No	Ranking
Bucklin	Yes	Yes	Yes	No	No		No	No	No	No	No	Yes	No	No	No	Yes	No	Yes	No	Ranking
Dodgson	Yes	No	No	Yes	No		No	No	No		No	No	No	No	No	No	No	No	No	Ranking
Approval	Yes	No	No	No	No	Yes	No	Yes	Yes (Note: Approval voting, score voting, and majority judgment satisfy IIA if it is assumed that voters rate candidates independently using their own absolute scale. For this to hold, in some elections, some voters must use less than their full voting power despite having meaningful preferences among viable candidates.)	Yes	Yes	Yes	Yes	Yes	Yes	Yes	No	Yes	Yes	Approvals
Majority Judgement	No	No (Note: Majority Judgment may elect a candidate uniquely least-preferred by over half of voters, but it never elects the candidate uniquely bottom-rated by over half of voters.)	No (Note: Majority Judgment fails the mutual majority criterion, but satisfies the criterion if the majority ranks the mutually favored set above a given absolute grade and all others below that grade.)	No	No		No	Yes	Yes		Yes	Yes	No	No		Yes	No	Yes	Yes	Scores
Score	No	No	No	No	No		No	Yes	Yes		Yes	Yes	Yes	Yes	Yes	Yes	No	Yes	Yes	Scores
STAR	No	Yes	No	No	Yes		No	No	No	No	No	Yes	No	No	No		No	No	No	Scores
Quadratic	No	No	No	No	No		No	No	No		No	Yes	Yes	Yes			N/A	N/A	No	Credits
Random ballot (Note: A randomly chosen ballot determines the winner. It is the unique social choice rule that treats all voters equally while still being strategyproof in all situations.)	No	No	No	No	No	Yes	No	Yes	Yes	Yes	Yes	Yes		Yes	No	Yes	Yes	Yes	Yes	Single mark
Maximal lotteries	Yes	Yes	Yes	Yes	Yes	Yes	Yes		No		Yes	No	Yes	No	No					Ranking
Sortition (Note: Where a winner is randomly chosen from the candidates, sortition is included to demonstrate that even non-voting methods can pass some criteria.)	No	No	No	No	No	No	No	Yes	Yes	No	No	Yes	N/A	Yes	N/A	N/A	Yes	Yes	Yes	None
Table Notes																				
