= Copeland's method =

Single-winner ranked vote system

The Copeland or Llull method is a ranked-choice voting system based on counting each candidate's pairwise wins and losses.

In the system, voters rank candidates from best to worst on their ballot. Candidates then compete in a round-robin tournament, where the ballots are used to determine which candidate would be preferred by a majority of voters in each matchup. The winner is the candidate who wins the most matchups (with ties winning half a point).

Copeland's method falls in the class of Condorcet methods, as any candidate who wins every one-on-one election will clearly have the most victories overall. Copeland's method has the advantage of being likely the simplest Condorcet method to explain and of being easy to administer by hand. On the other hand, as one-on-one ties are common or score ties are common, the procedure frequently results in ties, hence often producing no Condorcet winner. As a result, it is typically only used for low-stakes elections.

A special case of this method is promoted by Better Choices for Democracy under the name Consensus Choice Voting.

== History ==
Copeland's method was devised by Ramon Llull in his 1299 treatise Ars Electionis, which was discussed by Nicholas of Cusa in the fifteenth century. However, it is frequently named after Arthur Herbert Copeland, who advocated it independently in a 1951 lecture.

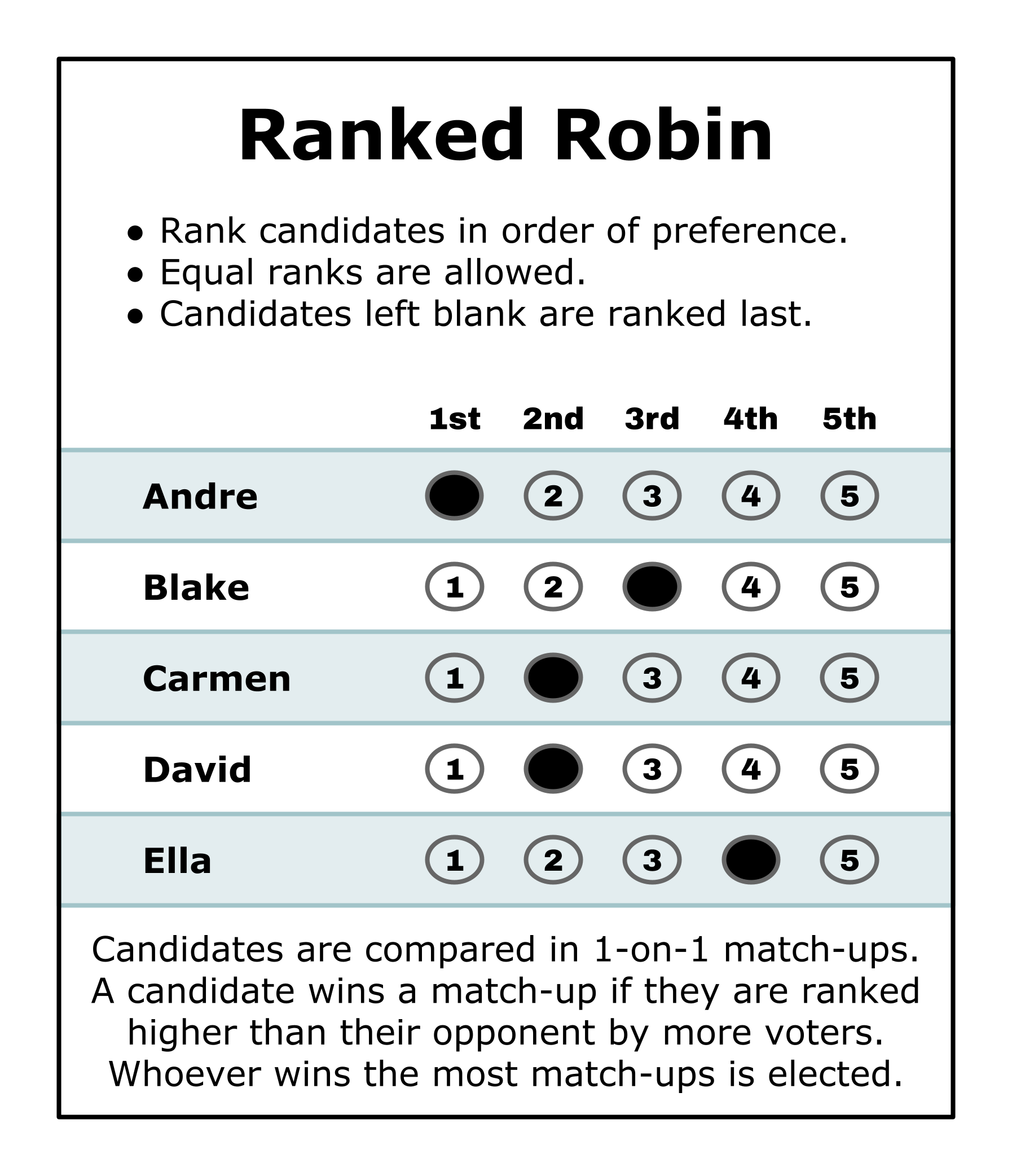
A simple description of Copeland's method.

== Voting mechanism ==
=== Ballot ===
The input is the same as for other ranked voting systems: each voter must furnish an ordered preference list on candidates where ties are allowed (a strict weak order).

This can be done by providing each voter with a list of candidates on which to write a "1" against the most preferred candidate, a "2" against the second preference, and so forth. A voter who leaves some candidates' rankings blank is assumed to be indifferent between them but to prefer all ranked candidates to them.

=== Computation ===
A results matrix r is constructed as follows: r_{ij} is

- 1 if more voters strictly prefer candidate i to candidate j than prefer j to i
- 1/2 if the numbers are equal
- 0 if more voters prefer j to i than prefer i to j.

This may be called the "1/1/2/0" method (one number for wins, ties, and losses, respectively).

By convention, r_{ii} is 0.

The Copeland score for candidate i is the sum over j of the r_{ij}. If there is a candidate with a score of n − 1 (where n is the number of candidates) then this candidate is the (necessarily unique) Condorcet and Copeland winner. Otherwise the Condorcet method produces no decision and the candidate with greatest score is the Copeland winner (but may not be unique).

An alternative (and equivalent) way to construct the results matrix is by letting r_{ij} be 1 if more voters strictly prefer candidate i to candidate j than prefer j to i, 0 if the numbers are equal, and −1 if more voters prefer j to i than prefer i to j. In this case the matrix r is antisymmetric.

=== Tied preferences ===
The method as initially described above is sometimes called the "1/1/2/0" method. Llull himself put forward a 1/1/0 method, so that two candidates with equal support would both get the same credit as if they had beaten the other.

Preference ties become increasingly unlikely as the number of voters increases.

=== Use in sporting tournaments ===
A method related to Copeland's is commonly used in round-robin tournaments. Generally it is assumed that each pair of competitors plays the same number of games against each other. r_{ij} is the number of times competitor i won against competitor j plus half the number of draws between them.

It was adopted in precisely this form in international chess in the middle of the nineteenth century. It was adopted in the first season of the English Football League (1888–1889), the organisers having initially considered using a 1/0/0 system. For convenience the numbers were doubled, i.e. the system was written as 2/1/0 rather than as 1/1/2/0.

(The Borda count has also been used to judge sporting tournaments. The Borda count is analogous to a tournament in which every completed ballot determines the result of a game between every pair of competitors.)

== Rationale ==
In many cases decided by Copeland's method the winner is the unique candidate satisfying the Condorcet criterion; in these cases, the arguments for that criterion (which are powerful, but not universally accepted) apply equally to Copeland's method.

When there is no Condorcet winner, Copeland's method seeks to make a decision by a natural extension of the Condorcet method, combining preferences by simple addition. The justification for this lies more in its simplicity than in logical arguments.

The Borda count is another method which combines preferences additively. The salient difference is that a voter's preference for one candidate over another has a weight in the Borda system which increases with the number of candidates ranked between them. The argument from the viewpoint of the Borda count is that the number of intervening candidates gives an indication of the strength of the preference; the counter-argument is that it depends to a worrying degree on which candidates stood in the election.

Partha Dasgupta and Eric Maskin sought to justify Copeland's method in a popular journal, where they compare it with the Borda count and plurality voting. Their argument turns on the merits of the Condorcet criterion, paying particular attention to opinions lying on a spectrum. The use of Copeland's method in the first instance, and then of a tie-break, to decide elections with no Condorcet winner is presented as "perhaps the simplest modification" to the Condorcet method.

== Tied results ==
Like any voting method, Copeland's may give rise to tied results if two candidates receive equal numbers of votes; but unlike most methods, it may also lead to ties for causes which do not disappear as the electorate becomes larger. This may happen whenever there are Condorcet cycles in the voting preferences, as illustrated by the following example.

Suppose that there are four candidates, Able, Baker, Charlie and Drummond, and five voters, of whom two vote A-B-C-D, two vote B-C-D-A, and one votes D-A-B-C. The results between pairs of candidates are shown in the main part of the following table, with the Copeland score for the first candidate in the additional column.

2nd 1st	A	B	C	D	score
A	—	3:2	3:2	2:3	2
B	2:3	—	5:0	4:1	2
C	2:3	0:5	—	4:1	1
D	3:2	1:4	1:4	—	1

No candidate satisfies the Condorcet criterion, and there is a Copeland tie between A and B. If there were 100 times as many voters, but they voted in roughly the same proportions (subject to sampling fluctuations), then the numbers of ballots would scale up but the Copeland scores would stay the same; for instance the 'A' row might read:

A	—	317:183	296:204	212:288	2

The risk of ties is particularly concerning because the main aim of Copeland's method is to produce a winner in cases when no candidate satisfies the Condorcet criterion. A simulation performed by Richard Darlington implies that for fields of up to 10 candidates, it will succeed in this task less than half the time.

In general, if voters vote according to preferences along a spectrum, the median voter theorem guarantees the absence of Condorcet cycles. Consequently such cycles can only arise either because voters' preferences do not lie along a spectrum or because voters do not vote according to their preferences (eg. for tactical reasons).

Nicolaus Tideman and Florenz Plassman conducted a large study of reported electoral preferences. They found a significant number of cycles in the subelections, but remarked that they could be attributed wholly or largely to the smallness of the numbers of voters. They concluded that it was consistent with their data to suppose that "voting cycles will occur very rarely, if at all, in elections with many voters".

=== Proposed tie breaks ===
Instant runoff (IRV), minimax and the Borda count are natural tie-breaks. The first two are not frequently advocated for this use but are sometimes discussed in connection with Smith's method where similar considerations apply.

Dasgupta and Maskin proposed the Borda count as a Copeland tie-break: this is known as the Dasgupta-Maskin method. It had previously been used in figure-skating under the name of the 'OBO' (=one-by-one) rule.

The alternatives can be illustrated in the 'Able-Baker' example above, in which Able and Baker are joint Copeland winners. Charlie and Drummond are eliminated, reducing the ballots to 3 A-Bs and 2 B-As. Any tie-break will then elect Able.

== Properties ==
Copeland's method has many of the standard desirable properties (see the table below). Most importantly it satisfies the Condorcet criterion, i.e. if a candidate would win against each of their rivals in a one-on-one vote, this candidate is the winner. Copeland's method therefore satisfies the median voter theorem, which states that if views lie along a spectrum, then the winning candidate will be the one preferred by the median voter.

Copeland's method also satisfies the Smith criterion.

The analogy between Copeland's method and sporting tournaments, and the overall simplicity of Copeland's method, has been argued to make it more acceptable to voters than other Condorcet algorithms.

=== Comparison with other systems ===
Comparison of single-winner voting systems
Criterion Method	Majority winner	Majority loser	Mutual majority	Condorcet winner (Note: Condorcet's criterion is incompatible with the consistency, independence of irrelevant alternatives, participation, later-no-harm, later-no-help, and sincere favorite criteria.)	Condorcet loser	Pareto	Smith	Smith-IIA	IIA	IPDA	Cloneproof	Monotone	Consistency	Participation	Reversal symmetry	Homogeneity	Later-no-harm	Later-no-help	Sincere favorite	Ballot type
Plurality	Yes	No	No	No	No	Yes	No	No	No		No	Yes	Yes	Yes	No	Yes	Yes	Yes	No	Single mark
Anti-plurality	No	Yes	No	No	No		No	No	No		No	Yes	Yes	Yes	No	Yes	No	No	Yes	Single mark
Two round system	Yes	Yes	No	No	Yes		No	No	No		No	No	No	No		Yes	Yes	Yes	No	Single mark
Instant-runoff	Yes	Yes	Yes	No	Yes	Yes	No	No	No		Yes	No	No	No	No	Yes	Yes	Yes	No	Ranking
Coombs	Yes	Yes	Yes	No	Yes		No	No	No		No	No	No	No		Yes	No	No	Yes	Ranking
Nanson	Yes	Yes	Yes	Yes	Yes		Yes	No	No		No	No	No	No	Yes		No	No	No	Ranking
Baldwin	Yes	Yes	Yes	Yes	Yes		Yes	No	No		No	No	No	No	No		No	No	No	Ranking
Tideman alternative	Yes	Yes	Yes	Yes	Yes		Yes	Yes	No		Yes	No	No	No	No		No	No	No	Ranking
Minimax	Yes	No	No	Yes (Note: A variant of Minimax that counts only pairwise opposition, not opposition minus support, fails the Condorcet criterion and meets later-no-harm.)	No		No	No	No	Yes	No	Yes	No	No	No	Yes	No	No	No	Ranking
Copeland	Yes	Yes	Yes	Yes	Yes	Yes	Yes	Yes	No		No	Yes	No	No			No	No	No	Ranking
Black	Yes	Yes	No	Yes	Yes	Yes	No	No	No		No	Yes	No	No	Yes	Yes	No	No	No	Ranking
Kemeny	Yes	Yes	Yes	Yes	Yes	Yes	Yes	Yes	Local IIA only		No	Yes	No	No	Yes	Yes	No	No	No	Ranking
Ranked pairs	Yes	Yes	Yes	Yes	Yes	Yes	Yes	Yes	Local IIA only	No	Yes	Yes	No	No (Note: In Highest median, Ranked Pairs, and Schulze voting, there is always a regret-free, semi-honest ballot for any voter, holding all other ballots constant and assuming they know enough about how others will vote. Under such circumstances, there is always at least one way for a voter to participate without grading any less-preferred candidate above any more-preferred one.)	Yes	Yes	No	No	No	Ranking
Schulze	Yes	Yes	Yes	Yes	Yes	Yes	Yes	Yes	No	No	Yes	Yes	No	No	Yes	Yes	No	No	No	Ranking
Borda	No	Yes	No	No	Yes		No	No	No		No	Yes	Yes	Yes	Yes	Yes	No	Yes	No	Ranking
Bucklin	Yes	Yes	Yes	No	No		No	No	No		No	Yes	No	No	No	Yes	No	Yes	No	Ranking
Dodgson	Yes	No	No	Yes	No		No	No	No		No	No	No	No	No	No	No	No	No	Ranking
Approval	Yes	No	No	No	No	Yes	No	Yes	Yes (Note: Approval voting, score voting, and majority judgment satisfy IIA if it is assumed that voters rate candidates independently using their own absolute scale. For this to hold, in some elections, some voters must use less than their full voting power despite having meaningful preferences among viable candidates.)	Yes	Yes	Yes	Yes	Yes	Yes	Yes	No	Yes	Yes	Approvals
Majority Judgement	No	No (Note: Majority Judgment may elect a candidate uniquely least-preferred by over half of voters, but it never elects the candidate uniquely bottom-rated by over half of voters.)	No (Note: Majority Judgment fails the mutual majority criterion, but satisfies the criterion if the majority ranks the mutually favored set above a given absolute grade and all others below that grade.)	No	No		No	Yes	Yes		Yes	Yes	No	No		Yes	No	Yes	Yes	Scores
Score	No	No	No	No	No		No	Yes	Yes		Yes	Yes	Yes	Yes	Yes	Yes	No	Yes	Yes	Scores
STAR	No	Yes	No	No	Yes		No	No	No		No	Yes	No	No	No		No	No	No	Scores
Quadratic	No	No	No	No	No		No	No	No		No	Yes	Yes	Yes			N/A	N/A	No	Credits
Random ballot (Note: A randomly chosen ballot determines winner. This and closely related methods are of mathematical interest and included here to demonstrate that even unreasonable methods can pass voting method criteria.)	No	No	No	No	No	Yes	No	Yes	Yes	Yes	Yes	Yes		Yes	No	Yes	Yes	Yes	Yes	Single mark
Sortition (Note: Where a winner is randomly chosen from the candidates, sortition is included to demonstrate that even non-voting methods can pass some criteria.)	No	No	No	No	No	No	No	Yes	Yes		No	Yes	N/A	Yes	N/A	N/A	Yes	Yes	Yes	None
Table Notes																				

== Examples of the Copeland Method ==
=== Example with Condorcet winner ===
Tennessee voting pattern

42% of voters	26% of voters	15% of voters	17% of voters
1. Memphis; 2. Nashville; 3. Chattanooga; 4. Knoxville	1. Nashville; 2. Chattanooga; 3. Knoxville; 4. Memphis	1. Chattanooga; 2. Knoxville; 3. Nashville; 4. Memphis	1. Knoxville; 2. Chattanooga; 3. Nashville; 4. Memphis

Suppose Tennessee is holding an election on the location of its capital. The population is split between four cities, and all the voters want the capital to be as close to them as possible. The options are:

- Memphis, large but far to the west
- Nashville, medium, near the center
- Chattanooga, small and in the east
- Knoxville, small and isolated

To find the Condorcet winner, every candidate must be matched against every other candidate in a series of imaginary one-on-one contests. In each pairing, each voter will choose the city physically closest to their location. In each pairing the winner is the candidate preferred by a majority of voters. When results for every possible pairing have been found they are as follows:

Comparison	Result	Winner
Memphis vs Nashville	42 v 58	Nashville
Memphis vs Knoxville	42 v 58	Knoxville
Memphis vs Chattanooga	42 v 58	Chattanooga
Nashville vs Knoxville	68 v 32	Nashville
Nashville vs Chattanooga	68 v 32	Nashville
Knoxville vs Chattanooga	17 v 83	Chattanooga

The wins and losses of each candidate sum as follows:

Candidate	Wins	Losses	Net	r
Memphis	0	3	−3	0 0 0 0
Nashville	3	0	3	1 0 1 1
Knoxville	1	2	−1	1 0 0 0
Chattanooga	2	1	1	1 0 1 0

Nashville, with no defeats, is the Condorcet winner. The Copeland score under the 1/0/−1 method is the number of net wins, maximized by Nashville. Since the voters expressed a preference one way or the other between every pair of candidates, the score under the 1/ 1/2/0 method is just the number of wins, likewise maximized by Nashville. The r matrix for this scoring system is shown in the final column.

=== Example without Condorcet winner ===
In an election with five candidates competing for one seat, the following votes were cast using a ranked voting method (100 votes with four distinct sets):

31: A > E > C > D > B	30: B > A > E	29: C > D > B	10: D > A > E

In this example there are some tied votes: for instance 10% of the voters assigned no position to B or C in their rankings; they are therefore considered to have tied these candidates with each other while ranking them below D, A and E.

The results of the 10 possible pairwise comparisons between the candidates are as follows:

Comparison	Result	Winner	Comparison	Result	Winner
A v B	41 v 59	B	B v D	30 v 70	D
A v C	71 v 29	A	B v E	59 v 41	B
A v D	61 v 39	A	C v D	60 v 10	C
A v E	71 v 0	A	C v E	29 v 71	E
B v C	30 v 60	C	D v E	39 v 61	E

The wins and losses of each candidate sum as follows:

Candidate	Wins	Losses	Net	r
A	3	1	2	0 0 1 1 1
B	2	2	0	1 0 0 0 1
C	2	2	0	0 1 0 1 0
D	1	3	−2	0 1 0 0 0
E	2	2	0	0 0 1 1 0

No Condorcet winner (candidate who beats all other candidates in pairwise comparisons) exists. Candidate A is the Copeland winner. Again there is no pair of candidates between whom the voters express no preference.

== Use for producing a tabulation in other methods ==
Since Copeland's method produces a total ordering of candidates by score and is simple to compute, it is often useful for producing a sorted list of candidates in conjunction with another voting method which does not produce a total order. For example, the Schulze and Ranked pairs methods produce a transitive partial ordering of candidates, which generally produces a single winner, but not a unique way of tabulating runner-ups. Applying Copeland's method according to the respective method's partial ordering will yield a total order (topological ordering) guaranteed to be compatible with the method's partial order, and is simpler than a depth-first search when the partial order is given by an adjacency matrix.

More generally, the Copeland score has the useful property that if there is a subset S of candidates such that every candidate in S will beat every candidate not in S, then there exists a threshold θ such that every candidate with a Copeland score above θ is in S while every candidate with a Copeland score below θ is not in S. This makes the Copeland score practical for finding various subsets of candidates that may be of interest, such as the Smith set or the dominant mutual third set.

== See also ==
- Ranked voting
- Comparison of electoral systems
- List of democracy and elections-related topics
- Voting systems
- Multiwinner voting – contains information on some multiwinner variants of Copeland.
