= Ranked pairs =

Single-winner electoral system

Ranked Pairs (RP), also known as the Tideman method, is a ranked voting method that determines a single winner from ballots that rank candidates in order of preference. The method is like a round-robin tournament in that it examines every possible pairing of one candidate against another.

The ballots are used to determine the winner in any race with just two candidates, based upon which of the two candidates is ranked higher on each ballot. If there is a candidate who wins regardless of whom they are paired against then that candidate is elected the winner. If there is no candidate who wins every pairing then the pairings with a more decisive win dominate those that are less decisive. For example, if Paper beats Rock, Rock beats Scissors, and Scissors beats Paper; and it is the case that the first two wins are more decisive than the third, then the third is ignored and Paper is elected the winner by virtue of winning their remaining pairings.

This system of ranked voting was first proposed by Nicolaus Tideman in 1987. Unlike Instant Runoff Voting, Ranked Pairs is guaranteed to satisfy the Condorcet winner criterion, meaning that any candidate who beats every other candidate, in a one-on-one race between the two, will be elected the winner.

== Procedure ==
The ranked pairs procedure is as follows:

1. Consider each pair of candidates round-robin style, and calculate the pairwise margin of victory for each in a one-on-one pairing.
2. Sort the pairs by the absolute margin of victory, going from largest to smallest.
3. Going down the list, check whether adding each pairing would create a cycle. If it would, cross out the election; this will be the election(s) in the cycle with the smallest margin of victory (near-ties). (Note: Rather than crossing out near-ties, step 3 is sometimes described as going down the list and confirming ("locking in") the largest victories that do not create a cycle, then ignoring any victories that are not locked-in.)

At the end of this procedure, all cycles will be eliminated, leaving a unique winner who wins all of their remaining one-on-one pairings. The lack of cycles means that candidates can be ranked directly based on the pairings that have been left behind.

== Example ==
=== The situation ===
Tennessee voting pattern

42% of voters	26% of voters	15% of voters	17% of voters
1. Memphis; 2. Nashville; 3. Chattanooga; 4. Knoxville	1. Nashville; 2. Chattanooga; 3. Knoxville; 4. Memphis	1. Chattanooga; 2. Knoxville; 3. Nashville; 4. Memphis	1. Knoxville; 2. Chattanooga; 3. Nashville; 4. Memphis

Suppose Tennessee is holding an election on the location of its capital. The population is split between four cities, and all the voters want the capital to be as close to them as possible. The options are:

- Memphis, large but far to the west
- Nashville, medium, near the center
- Chattanooga, small and in the east
- Knoxville, small and isolated

The results are tabulated as follows:

Pairwise election results
A B	Memphis	Nashville	Chattanooga	Knoxville
Memphis		58% 42%	58% 42%	58% 42%
Nashville	42% 58%		32% 68%	32% 68%
Chattanooga	42% 58%	68% 32%		17% 83%
Knoxville	42% 58%	68% 32%	83% 17%	

- [A] indicates voters who preferred the candidate listed in the column caption to the candidate listed in the row caption
- [B] indicates voters who preferred the candidate listed in the row caption to the candidate listed in the column caption

=== Tally ===
First, list every pair, and determine the winner:

Pair	Winner
Memphis (42%) vs. Nashville (58%)	Nashville 58%
Memphis (42%) vs. Chattanooga (58%)	Chattanooga 58%
Memphis (42%) vs. Knoxville (58%)	Knoxville 58%
Nashville (68%) vs. Chattanooga (32%)	Nashville 68%
Nashville (68%) vs. Knoxville (32%)	Nashville 68%
Chattanooga (83%) vs. Knoxville (17%)	Chattanooga 83%

The votes are then sorted. The largest majority is "Chattanooga over Knoxville"; 83% of the voters prefer Chattanooga. Thus, the pairs from above would be sorted this way:

Pair	Winner
Chattanooga (83%) vs. Knoxville (17%)	Chattanooga 83%
Nashville (68%) vs. Knoxville (32%)	Nashville 68%
Nashville (68%) vs. Chattanooga (32%)	Nashville 68%
Memphis (42%) vs. Nashville (58%)	Nashville 58%
Memphis (42%) vs. Chattanooga (58%)	Chattanooga 58%
Memphis (42%) vs. Knoxville (58%)	Knoxville 58%

=== Lock ===
The pairs are then locked in order, skipping any pairs that would create a cycle:

- Lock Chattanooga over Knoxville.
- Lock Nashville over Knoxville.
- Lock Nashville over Chattanooga.
- Lock Nashville over Memphis.
- Lock Chattanooga over Memphis.
- Lock Knoxville over Memphis.

In this case, no cycles are created by any of the pairs, so every single one is locked in.

Every "lock in" would add another arrow to the graph showing the relationship between the candidates. Here is the final graph (where arrows point away from the winner).

In this example, Nashville is the winner using the ranked-pairs procedure. Nashville is followed by Chattanooga, Knoxville, and Memphis in second, third, and fourth places respectively.

=== Summary ===
In the example election, the winner is Nashville. This would be true for any Condorcet method.

Under first-past-the-post and some other systems, Memphis would have won the election by having the most people, even though Nashville won every simulated pairwise election outright. Using instant-runoff voting in this example would result in Knoxville winning even though more people preferred Nashville over Knoxville.

== Criteria ==
Of the formal voting criteria, the ranked pairs method passes the majority criterion, the monotonicity criterion, the Smith criterion (which implies the Condorcet criterion), the Condorcet loser criterion, and the independence of clones criterion. Ranked pairs fails the consistency criterion and the participation criterion. While ranked pairs is not fully independent of irrelevant alternatives, it still satisfies local independence of irrelevant alternatives and independence of Smith-dominated alternatives, meaning it is likely to roughly satisfy IIA "in practice."

=== Independence of irrelevant alternatives ===
Ranked pairs fails independence of irrelevant alternatives, like all other ranked voting systems. However, the method adheres to a less strict property, sometimes called independence of Smith-dominated alternatives (ISDA). It says that if one candidate (X) wins an election, and a new alternative (Y) is added, X will win the election if Y is not in the Smith set. ISDA implies the Condorcet criterion.

=== Comparison table ===
The following table compares ranked pairs with other single-winner election methods:

Comparison of single-winner voting systems
Criterion Method	Majority winner	Majority loser	Mutual majority	Condorcet winner (Note: Condorcet's criterion is incompatible with the consistency, independence of irrelevant alternatives, participation, later-no-harm, later-no-help, and sincere favorite criteria.)	Condorcet loser	Pareto	Smith	Smith-IIA	IIA/LIIA	IPDA	Cloneproof	Monotone	Consistency	Participation	Reversal symmetry	Homogeneity	Later-no-harm	Later-no-help	Sincere favorite	Ballot type
Plurality	Yes	No	No	No	No	Yes	No	No	No		No	Yes	Yes	Yes	No	Yes	Yes	Yes	No	Single mark
Anti-plurality	No	Yes	No	No	No	No	No	No	No	No	No	Yes	Yes	Yes	No	Yes	No	No	Yes	Single mark
Two round system	Yes	Yes	No	No	Yes		No	No	No		No	No	No	No		Yes	Yes	Yes	No	Single mark
Instant-runoff	Yes	Yes	Yes	No	Yes	Yes	No	No	No		Yes	No	No	No	No	Yes	Yes	Yes	No	Ranking
Coombs	Yes	Yes	Yes	No	Yes		No	No	No	No	No	No	No	No		Yes	No	No	Yes	Ranking
Nanson	Yes	Yes	Yes	Yes	Yes		Yes	No	No	No	No	No	No	No	Yes		No	No	No	Ranking
Baldwin	Yes	Yes	Yes	Yes	Yes		Yes	No	No	No	No	No	No	No	No		No	No	No	Ranking
Tideman alternative	Yes	Yes	Yes	Yes	Yes		Yes	Yes	No		Yes	No	No	No	No		No	No	No	Ranking
Minimax	Yes	No	No	Yes (Note: A variant of Minimax that counts only pairwise opposition, not opposition minus support, fails the Condorcet criterion and meets later-no-harm.)	No	Yes	No	No	No	Yes	No	Yes	No	No	No	Yes	No	No	No	Ranking
Copeland	Yes	Yes	Yes	Yes	Yes	Yes	Yes	Yes	No	No	No	Yes	No	No			No	No	No	Ranking
Black	Yes	Yes	No	Yes	Yes	Yes	No	No	No	No	No	Yes	No	No	Yes	Yes	No	No	No	Ranking
Kemeny	Yes	Yes	Yes	Yes	Yes	Yes	Yes	Yes	LIIA	No	No	Yes	No	No	Yes	Yes	No	No	No	Ranking
Ranked pairs	Yes	Yes	Yes	Yes	Yes	Yes	Yes	Yes	LIIA	No	Yes	Yes	No	No (Note: In Highest median, Ranked Pairs, and Schulze voting, there is always a regret-free, semi-honest ballot for any voter, holding all other ballots constant and assuming they know enough about how others will vote. Under such circumstances, there is always at least one way for a voter to participate without grading any less-preferred candidate above any more-preferred one.)	Yes	Yes	No	No	No	Ranking
Schulze	Yes	Yes	Yes	Yes	Yes	Yes	Yes	Yes	No	No	Yes	Yes	No	No	Yes	Yes	No	No	No	Ranking
Borda	No	Yes	No	No	Yes	Yes	No	No	No	No	No	Yes	Yes	Yes	Yes	Yes	No	Yes	No	Ranking
Bucklin	Yes	Yes	Yes	No	No		No	No	No	No	No	Yes	No	No	No	Yes	No	Yes	No	Ranking
Dodgson	Yes	No	No	Yes	No		No	No	No		No	No	No	No	No	No	No	No	No	Ranking
Approval	Yes	No	No	No	No	Yes	No	Yes	Yes (Note: Approval voting, score voting, and majority judgment satisfy IIA if it is assumed that voters rate candidates independently using their own absolute scale. For this to hold, in some elections, some voters must use less than their full voting power despite having meaningful preferences among viable candidates.)	Yes	Yes	Yes	Yes	Yes	Yes	Yes	No	Yes	Yes	Approvals
Majority Judgement	No	No (Note: Majority Judgment may elect a candidate uniquely least-preferred by over half of voters, but it never elects the candidate uniquely bottom-rated by over half of voters.)	No (Note: Majority Judgment fails the mutual majority criterion, but satisfies the criterion if the majority ranks the mutually favored set above a given absolute grade and all others below that grade.)	No	No		No	Yes	Yes		Yes	Yes	No	No		Yes	No	Yes	Yes	Scores
Score	No	No	No	No	No		No	Yes	Yes		Yes	Yes	Yes	Yes	Yes	Yes	No	Yes	Yes	Scores
STAR	No	Yes	No	No	Yes		No	No	No	No	No	Yes	No	No	No		No	No	No	Scores
Quadratic	No	No	No	No	No		No	No	No		No	Yes	Yes	Yes			N/A	N/A	No	Credits
Random ballot (Note: A randomly chosen ballot determines winner. This and closely related methods are of mathematical interest and included here to demonstrate that even unreasonable methods can pass voting method criteria.)	No	No	No	No	No	Yes	No	Yes	Yes	Yes	Yes	Yes		Yes	No	Yes	Yes	Yes	Yes	Single mark
Maximal lotteries	Yes			Yes	Yes	Yes	Yes		Yes		Yes	No	Yes	Yes						Ranking
Sortition (Note: Where a winner is randomly chosen from the candidates, sortition is included to demonstrate that even non-voting methods can pass some criteria.)	No	No	No	No	No	No	No	Yes	Yes	No	No	Yes	N/A	Yes	N/A	N/A	Yes	Yes	Yes	None
Table Notes																				
