= Majority rule =

Decision rule that selects alternatives that have a majority

In social choice theory, the majority rule (MR) is a social choice rule which says that, when comparing two options (such as bills or candidates), the option preferred by more than half of the voters (a majority) should win.

In political philosophy, the majority rule is one of two major competing notions of democracy. The most common alternative is given by the utilitarian rule (or other welfarist rules), which identify the spirit of liberal democracy with the equal consideration of interests. Although the two rules can disagree in theory, political philosophers beginning with James Mill have argued the two can be reconciled in practice, with majority rule being a valid approximation to the utilitarian rule whenever voters share similarly-strong preferences. This position has found strong support in many social choice models, where the socially-optimal winner and the majority-preferred winner often overlap.

Majority rule is the most common social choice rule worldwide, being heavily used in deliberative assemblies for dichotomous decisions, e.g. whether or not to pass a bill. Mandatory referendums where the question is yes or no are also generally decided by majority rule. It is one of the basic rules of parliamentary procedure, as described in handbooks like Robert's Rules of Order.

In elections with more than two candidates, majority-rule is generalized by Condorcet's majority-rule principle, which states that if most voters prefer option A to option B (rank A over B), then A should defeat B unless there is a Condorcet paradox.

== Alternatives ==
Pie charts plurality (left) and majority (right)

=== Plurality rules ===
A common alternative to the majority rule is the plurality-rule family of voting rules, which includes ranked choice voting (RCV), two-round plurality, and first-preference plurality. These rules are often used in elections with more than two candidates. Such rules elect the candidate with the most votes after applying some voting procedure, even if a majority of voters would prefer some other alternative.

Systems in the plurality-rule family share several major features like center squeeze and tend to produce similar results. Plurality rule is often contrasted with the two other major families of voting rules, the evaluative rules and the majority (or Condorcet) rules.

=== Cardinal rules ===
The utilitarian rule, and cardinal social choice rules in general, take into account not just the number of voters who support each choice but also the intensity of their preferences.

Philosophers critical of majority rule have often argued that majority rule does not take into account the intensity of preference for different voters, and as a result "two voters who are casually interested in doing something" can defeat one voter who has "dire opposition" to the proposal of the two, leading to poor deliberative practice or even to "an aggressive culture and conflict"; however, the median voter theorem guarantees that majority-rule will tend to elect "compromise" or "consensus" candidates in many situations, unlike plurality-rules (see center squeeze).

=== Supermajority rules ===
Parliamentary rules may prescribe the use of a supermajoritarian rule under certain circumstances, such as the 60% filibuster rule to close debate in the US Senate. However such requirement means that 41 percent of the members or more could prevent debate from being closed, an example where the majority will would be blocked by a minority. Byzantine Fault Tolerance studies offer a technical mathematical proof for the basis of consent that requires a minimum supermajority consensus threshold greater than two-thirds.

== Properties ==
=== May's theorem ===
Kenneth May proved that the simple majority rule is the only "fair" ordinal decision rule, in that majority rule does not let some votes count more than others or privilege an alternative by requiring fewer votes to pass. Formally, majority rule is the only decision rule that has the following properties:

- Anonymity: the decision rule treats each voter identically (one vote, one value). Who casts a vote makes no difference; the voter's identity need not be disclosed.
- Neutrality: the decision rule treats each alternative or candidate equally (a free and fair election).
- Decisiveness: if the vote is tied, adding a single voter (who expresses an opinion) will break the tie.
- Positive response: If a voter changes a preference, MR never switches the outcome against that voter. If the outcome the voter now prefers would have won, it still does so.
- Ordinality: the decision rule relies only on which of two outcomes a voter prefers, not how much.
  - This can be replaced by strategyproofness, i.e. every person's dominant strategy is to honestly disclose their preferences.

=== Agenda manipulation ===
If voters' preferences are defined over a multidimensional option space, then choosing options using pairwise majority rule is unstable. In most cases, there will be no Condorcet winner and any option can be chosen through a sequence of votes, regardless of the original option. This means that adding more options and changing the order of votes ("agenda manipulation") can be used to arbitrarily pick the winner.

=== Other properties ===
In group decision-making voting paradoxes can form. It is possible that alternatives a, b, and c exist such that a majority prefers a to b, another majority prefers b to c, and yet another majority prefers c to a. Because majority rule requires an alternative to have majority support to pass, majority rule is vulnerable to rejecting the majority's decision.

== Limitations ==
=== Arguments for limitations ===
==== Minority rights ====
A super-majority rule actually empowers the minority, making it stronger (at least through its veto) than the majority. McGann argued that when only one of multiple minorities is protected by the super-majority rule (same as seen in simple plurality elections systems), so the protection is for the status quo, rather than for the faction that supports it.

Another possible way to prevent tyranny is to elevate certain rights as inalienable. Thereafter, any decision that targets such a right might be majoritarian, but it would not be legitimate, because it would violate the requirement for equal rights.

==== Instability ====
Some social choice theorists have argued cycling leads to debilitating instability. Buchanan and Tullock note that unanimity is the only decision rule that guarantees economic efficiency and eliminates the possibility of cycling in all cases.

=== Arguments against limitations ===
==== Minority rights ====
McGann argued that majority rule helps to protect minority rights, at least in deliberative settings. The argument is that cycling ensures that parties that lose to a majority have an interest to remain part of the group's process, because any decision can easily be overturned by another majority. Furthermore, suppose a minority wishes to overturn a decision. In that case, under majority rule it just needs to form a coalition that has more than half of the officials involved and that will give it power. Under supermajority rules, a minority needs its own supermajority to overturn a decision.

To support the view that majority rule protects minority rights better than supermajority rules, McGann pointed to the cloture rule in the US Senate, which was used to prevent the extension of civil liberties to racial minorities. Saunders, while agreeing that majority rule may offer better protection than supermajority rules, argued that majority rule may nonetheless be of little help to the least minorities.

Under some circumstances, the legal rights of one person cannot be guaranteed without unjustly imposing on someone else. McGann wrote, "one man's right to property in the antebellum South was another man's slavery."

Amartya Sen has noted the existence of the liberal paradox, which shows that permitting assigning a very small number of rights to individuals may make everyone worse off.

==== Other arguments ====
Saunders argued that deliberative democracy flourishes under majority rule and that under majority rule, participants always have to convince more than half the group, while under supermajoritarian rules participants might only need to persuade a minority (to prevent a change).

Where large changes in seats held by a party may arise from only relatively slight change in votes cast (such as under FPTP), and a simple majority is all that is required to wield power (most legislatures in democratic countries), governments may repeatedly fall into and out of power. This may cause polarization and policy lurch, or it may encourage compromise, depending on other aspects of political culture. McGann argued that such cycling encourages participants to compromise, rather than pass resolutions that have the bare minimum required to "win", because of the likelihood that they would soon be reversed.

Within this atmosphere of compromise, a minority faction may accept proposals that it dislikes in order to build a coalition for a proposal that it deems of greater moment. In that way, majority rule differentiates weak and strong preferences. McGann argued that such situations encourage minorities to participate, because majority rule does not typically create permanent losers, encouraging systemic stability. He pointed to governments that use largely unchecked majority rule, such as is seen under proportional representation in the Netherlands, Austria, and Sweden, as empirical evidence of majority rule's stability.

== See also ==
- Appeal to the majority
- Arrow's theorem
- Condorcet's jury theorem
- Majority criterion
- Majority loser criterion
- Mutual majority criterion
- Majoritarianism
- Majoritarian democracy
- No independence before majority rule (NIBMAR)
- Ochlocracy
- Quadratic voting
- Voting system criterion
- Voting system
