= ISDA =

ISDA may refer to:

- Independence of Smith-dominated alternatives, a voting system criterion.
- Indian Self-Determination and Education Assistance Act of 1975, a United States law
- Industrial Designers Society of America
- International Semiconductor Development Alliance, technology alliance between IBM, AMD/GlobalFoundries, Freescale, Infineon, NEC, Samsung, STMicroelectronics and Toshiba.
- International Swaps and Derivatives Association, trade organization of participants in the market for over-the-counter derivatives
- Irish Student Drama Association, association for intercollegiate competition in Irish amateur student theatre
