= Resoluteness criterion =

Electoral system property

A voting system is called decisive, resolvable, or resolute if it ensures a low probability of tied elections. There are two different criterion that formalize this.

- In Nicolaus Tideman's version of the criterion, adding one extra vote (with no tied ranks) should make the winner unique.
- Douglas R. Woodall's version requires that the probability of a tied vote under an impartial culture model gives a tie approaches zero as the number of voters increases toward infinity.

A non-resolvable social choice function is often only considered to be a partial electoral method, sometimes called a voting correspondence or set-valued voting rule. Such methods frequently require tiebreakers that can substantially affect the result. However, non-resolute methods can be used as a first stage to eliminate candidates before ties are broken with some other method. Methods that have been used this way include the Copeland set, the Smith set, and the Landau set.
