= Unrestricted domain =

In social choice theory, unrestricted domain, or universality, is a property of social welfare functions in which all preferences of all voters (but no other considerations) are allowed. Intuitively, unrestricted domain is a common requirement for social choice functions, and is a condition for Arrow's impossibility theorem.

With unrestricted domain, the social welfare function accounts for all preferences among all voters to yield a unique and complete ranking of societal choices. Thus, the voting mechanism must account for all individual preferences, it must do so in a manner that results in a complete ranking of preferences for society, and it must deterministically provide the same ranking each time voters' preferences are presented the same way.

== Relation to Arrow's impossibility theorem ==
Unrestricted domain is one of the conditions for Arrow's impossibility theorem. Under that theorem, it is impossible to have a social choice function that satisfies unrestricted domain, Pareto efficiency, independence of irrelevant alternatives, and non-dictatorship. However, the conditions of the theorem can be satisfied if unrestricted domain is removed.

== Examples of restricted domains ==
Duncan Black defined a restriction to domains of social choice functions called "single-peaked preferences". Under this principle, all of the choices have a predetermined position along a line, giving them a linear ordering. Every voter has some special place he likes best along that line. His ordering of the choices is determined by their distances from that spot. For example, if voting on where to set the volume for music, it would be reasonable to assume that each voter had their own ideal volume preference and that as the volume got progressively too loud or too quiet they would be increasingly dissatisfied. Black proved that by replacing unrestricted domain with single-peaked preferences in Arrow's theorem removes the impossibility: there are Pareto-efficient non-dictatorships that satisfy the "independence of irrelevant alternatives" criterion. However, Black's 1948 proof was published before Arrow's impossibility theorem was published in 1950, and thus did not fully consider Arrow's "unrestricted domain" criterion.
