= Later-no-help criterion =

The later-no-help criterion (or LNHe, not to be confused with LNH) is a voting system criterion formulated by Douglas Woodall. The criterion is satisfied if, in any election, a voter giving an additional ranking or positive rating to a less-preferred candidate can not cause a more-preferred candidate to win. Voting systems that fail the later-no-help criterion are vulnerable to the tactical voting strategy called mischief voting, which can deny victory to a sincere Condorcet winner.

== Complying methods ==
Approval, instant-runoff, highest medians, and score all satisfy the later-no-help criterion. Plurality voting satisfies it trivially (as plurality only applies to the top-ranked candidate). Descending Solid Coalitions also satisfies later-no-help.

== Noncomplying methods ==
All Minimax Condorcet methods, Ranked Pairs, Schulze method, Kemeny-Young method, Copeland's method, and Nanson's method do not satisfy later-no-help. The Condorcet criterion is incompatible with later-no-help.

== Checking Compliance ==
Checking for failures of the Later-no-help criterion requires ascertaining the probability of a voter's preferred candidate being elected before and after adding a later preference to the ballot, to determine any increase in probability. Later-no-help presumes that later preferences are added to the ballot sequentially, so that candidates already listed are preferred to a candidate added later.

== Examples ==
=== Anti-plurality ===
Anti-plurality elects the candidate the fewest voters rank last when submitting a complete ranking of the candidates.

Later-No-Help can be considered not applicable to Anti-Plurality if the method is assumed to not accept truncated preference listings from the voter. On the other hand, Later-No-Help can be applied to Anti-Plurality if the method is assumed to apportion the last place vote among unlisted candidates equally, as shown in the example below.

==== Truncated Ballot Profile ====
Assume four voters (marked bold) submit a truncated preference listing A > B = C by apportioning the possible orderings for B and C equally. Each vote is counted $\tfrac{1}{2}$ A > B > C, and $\tfrac{1}{2}$ A > C > B:

# of voters	Preferences
2	A ( > B > C)
2	A ( > C > B)
4	B > A > C
3	C > B > A

Result: A is listed last on 3 ballots; B is listed last on 2 ballots; C is listed last on 6 ballots. B is listed last on the least ballots. B wins. A loses.

==== Adding Later Preferences ====
Now assume that the four voters supporting A (marked bold) add later preference C, as follows:

# of voters	Preferences
4	A > C > B
4	B > A > C
3	C > B > A

Result: A is listed last on 3 ballots; B is listed last on 4 ballots; C is listed last on 4 ballots. A is listed last on the least ballots. A wins.

==== Conclusion ====
The four voters supporting A increase the probability of A winning by adding later preference C to their ballot, changing A from a loser to the winner. Thus, Anti-plurality fails the Later-no-help criterion when truncated ballots are considered to apportion the last place vote amongst unlisted candidates equally.

=== Coombs' method ===
Coombs' method repeatedly eliminates the candidate listed last on most ballots, until a winner is reached. If at any time a candidate wins an absolute majority of first place votes among candidates not eliminated, that candidate is elected.

Later-No-Help can be considered not applicable to Coombs if the method is assumed to not accept truncated preference listings from the voter. On the other hand, Later-No-Help can be applied to Coombs if the method is assumed to apportion the last place vote among unlisted candidates equally, as shown in the example below.

==== Truncated Ballot Profile ====
Assume four voters (marked bold) submit a truncated preference listing A > B = C by apportioning the possible orderings for B and C equally. Each vote is counted $\tfrac{1}{2}$ A > B > C, and $\tfrac{1}{2}$ A > C > B:

# of voters	Preferences
2	A ( > B > C)
2	A ( > C > B)
4	B > A > C
4	C > B > A
2	C > A > B

Result: A is listed last on 4 ballots; B is listed last on 4 ballots; C is listed last on 6 ballots. C is listed last on the most ballots. C is eliminated, and B defeats A pairwise 8 to 6. B wins. A loses.

==== Adding Later Preferences ====
Now assume that the four voters supporting A (marked bold) add later preference C, as follows:

# of voters	Preferences
4	A > C > B
4	B > A > C
4	C > B > A
2	C > A > B

Result: A is listed last on 4 ballots; B is listed last on 6 ballots; C is listed last on 4 ballots. B is listed last on the most ballots. B is eliminated, and A defeats C pairwise 8 to 6. A wins.

==== Conclusion ====
The four voters supporting A increase the probability of A winning by adding later preference C to their ballot, changing A from a loser to the winner. Thus, Coombs' method fails the Later-no-help criterion when truncated ballots are considered to apportion the last place vote amongst unlisted candidates equally.

=== Copeland ===
This example shows that Copeland's method violates the Later-no-help criterion. Assume four candidates A, B, C and D with 7 voters:

==== Truncated preferences ====
Assume that the two voters supporting A (marked bold) do not express later preferences on the ballots:

# of voters	Preferences
2	A
3	B > A
1	C > D > A
1	D > C

The results would be tabulated as follows:

Pairwise election results
		X			
		A	B	C	D
Y	A		[X] 3 [Y] 3	[X] 2 [Y] 5	[X] 2 [Y] 5
Y	B	[X] 3 [Y] 3		[X] 2 [Y] 3	[X] 2 [Y] 3
Y	C	[X] 5 [Y] 2	[X] 3 [Y] 2		[X] 1 [Y] 1
Y	D	[X] 5 [Y] 2	[X] 3 [Y] 2	[X] 1 [Y] 1	
Pairwise election results (won-tied-lost):		2-1-0	2-1-0	0-1-2	0-1-2

Result: Both A and B have two pairwise wins and one pairwise tie, so A and B are tied for the Copeland winner. Depending on the tie resolution method used, A can lose.

==== Express later preferences ====
Now assume the two voters supporting A (marked bold) express later preferences on their ballot.

# of voters	Preferences
2	A > C > D
3	B > A
1	C > D > A
1	D > C

The results would be tabulated as follows:

Pairwise election results
		X			
		A	B	C	D
Y	A		[X] 3 [Y] 3	[X] 2 [Y] 5	[X] 2 [Y] 5
Y	B	[X] 3 [Y] 3		[X] 4 [Y] 3	[X] 4 [Y] 3
Y	C	[X] 5 [Y] 2	[X] 3 [Y] 4		[X] 1 [Y] 3
Y	D	[X] 5 [Y] 2	[X] 3 [Y] 4	[X] 3 [Y] 1	
Pairwise election results (won-tied-lost):		2-1-0	0-1-2	2-0-1	1-0-2

Result: B now has two pairwise defeats. A still has two pairwise wins, one tie, and no defeats. Thus, A is elected Copeland winner.

==== Conclusion ====
By expressing later preferences, the two voters supporting A promote their first preference A from a tie to becoming the outright winner (increasing the probability that A wins). Thus, Copeland's method fails the Later-no-help criterion.

=== Dodgson's method ===
Dodgson's' method elects a Condorcet winner if there is one, and otherwise elects the candidate who can become the Condorcet winner after the fewest ordinal preference swaps on voters' ballots.

Later-No-Help can be considered not applicable to Dodgson if the method is assumed to not accept truncated preference listings from the voter. On the other hand, Later-No-Help can be applied to Dodgson if the method is assumed to apportion possible rankings among unlisted candidates equally, as shown in the example below.

==== Truncated Ballot Profile ====
Assume ten voters (marked bold) submit a truncated preference listing A > B = C by apportioning the possible orderings for B and C equally. Each vote is counted $\tfrac{1}{2}$ A > B > C, and $\tfrac{1}{2}$ A > C > B:

# of voters	Preferences
5	A ( > B > C)
5	A ( > C > B)
10	B > A > C
2	C > B > A
1	C > A > B

Pairwise Contests
	Against A	Against B	Against C
For A		11	20
For B	12		15
For C	3	8	

Result: B is the Condorcet winner and the Dodgson winner. A loses.

==== Adding Later Preferences ====
Now assume that the ten voters supporting A (marked bold) add later preference C, as follows:

# of voters	Preferences
10	A > C > B
10	B > A > C
2	C > B > A
1	C > A > B

Pairwise Contests
	Against A	Against B	Against C
For A		11	20
For B	12		10
For C	3	13	

Result: There is no Condorcet winner. A is the Dodgson winner, because A becomes the Condorcet Winner with only two ordinal preference swaps (changing B > A to A > B). A wins.

==== Conclusion ====
The ten voters supporting A increase the probability of A winning by adding later preference C to their ballot, changing A from a loser to the winner. Thus, Dodgson's method fails the Later-no-help criterion when truncated ballots are considered to apportion the possible rankings amongst unlisted candidates equally.

=== Ranked pairs ===
For example, in an election conducted using the Condorcet compliant method Ranked pairs the following votes are cast:

28: A	42: B>A	30: C

A is preferred to C by 70 votes to 30 votes. (Locked)
B is preferred to A by 42 votes to 28 votes. (Locked)
B is preferred to C by 42 votes to 30 votes. (Locked)

B is the Condorcet winner and therefore the Ranked pairs winner.

Suppose the 28 A voters specify second choice C (they are burying B).

The votes are now:

28: A>C	42: B>A	30: C

A is preferred to C by 70 votes to 30 votes. (Locked)
C is preferred to B by 58 votes to 42 votes. (Locked)
B is preferred to A by 42 votes to 28 votes. (Cycle)

There is no Condorcet winner and A is the Ranked pairs winner.

By giving a second preference to candidate C the 28 A voters have caused their first choice to win. Note that, should the C voters decide to bury A in response, B will beat A by 72, restoring B to victory.

Similar examples can be constructed for any Condorcet-compliant method, as the Condorcet and later-no-help criteria are incompatible.

== See also ==
- Later-no-harm criterion
