= Condorcet winner =

Property of electoral systems

A Condorcet winner (French: [kɔ̃dɔʁsɛ], English: /kɒndɔːrˈseɪ/) is a candidate who would receive more support than their opponent in a one-on-one race against any one of their opponents. Voting systems where a Condorcet winner will always win the election are said to satisfy the Condorcet winner criterion. The Condorcet winner criterion extends the principle of majority rule to elections with multiple candidates.

Named after Nicolas de Condorcet, it is also called a majority winner, a majority-preferred candidate, a beats-all winner, or tournament winner (by analogy with round-robin tournaments). A Condorcet winner may not necessarily always exist in a given electorate: for example, it is possible to have a rock paper scissors-style cycle, when multiple candidates defeat each other (rock < paper < scissors < rock). This is called Condorcet's voting paradox, and is analogous to the counterintuitive intransitive dice phenomenon known in probability. However, the Smith set, a generalization of the Condorcet criteria that is the smallest set of candidates that are pairwise unbeaten by every candidate outside of it, will always exist.

If voters are arranged on a single 1-dimensional axis, such as a left-right political spectrum, and always prefer candidates who are more similar to themselves, a majority-rule winner always exists and is the candidate whose ideology is most representative of the electorate; this result is known as the median voter theorem. However, political electorates are inherently multidimensional in real-life, and the use of a one- or even two-dimensional model of such electorates would be inaccurate. For multi-dimensional spaces there might be no Condorcet winner according to the McKelvey–Schofield chaos theorem.

Previous research has found cycles to be somewhat rare in real elections, with estimates of their prevalence ranging from 1% to 10% of races.

Systems that guarantee the election of a Condorcet winners (when one exists) include Ranked pairs, Schulze's method, and the Tideman alternative method. Methods that do not guarantee that the Cordorcet winner will be elected, even when one does exist, include instant-runoff voting (often called ranked-choice in the United States), first-past-the-post voting, and the two-round system. Most rated systems (like score voting and the highest median rules) are not Condorcet methods, as they try to account for the strengths of different voters' preferences rather than always following the majority.

== History ==
Condorcet methods were first studied in detail by Ramon Llull, a Spanish philosopher and theologian in the 13th century, during his investigations into church governance. Because his manuscript Ars Electionis was lost soon after his death, his ideas were overlooked for the next 500 years.

The first revolution in voting theory coincided with the rediscovery of these ideas during the Age of Enlightenment by Nicolas de Caritat, Marquis de Condorcet, a mathematician and political philosopher.

== Example ==
Suppose the government comes across a windfall source of funds and has three options for what to do with the money: spend it, use it to cut taxes, or use it to pay off the debt. The government holds a vote where it asks citizens which of two options they would prefer and tabulates the results as follows:

	... vs. Spend more	... vs. Cut taxes	
Pay debt	403–305	496–212	2–0
Cut taxes	522–186	1–1	
Spend more	0–2		

In this case, the option of paying off the debt is the beats-all winner because repaying debt is more popular than the other two options.

Such a winner will not always exist; in that case, tournament solutions search for the candidate who is closest to being an undefeated champion. Majority-rule winners can be determined from rankings by counting the number of voters who rated each candidate higher than another.

== Desirable properties ==
The Condorcet criterion is related to several other voting system criteria.

=== Stability (no-weak-spoilers) ===
Condorcet methods are highly resistant to spoiler effects. Intuitively, this is because the only way to dislodge a Condorcet winner is by beating them, implying spoilers can exist only if there is no majority-rule winner.

=== Participation ===
One disadvantage of majority-rule methods is they can all theoretically fail the participation criterion in constructed examples. However, studies suggest this is empirically rare for modern Condorcet methods, like ranked pairs. One study surveying 306 publicly-available election datasets found no examples of participation failures for methods in the ranked pairs-minimax family.

=== Majoritarian criteria ===
The Condorcet criterion implies the majority criterion since a candidate ranked first by a majority is clearly ranked above every other candidate by a majority.

When a Condorcet winner exists, this candidate is also part of the smallest mutual majority set, so any Condorcet method passes the mutual majority criterion and Condorcet loser in elections where a Condorcet winner exist. However, this need not hold in full generality: for instance, the minimax Condorcet method fails the Condorcet loser and mutual majority criteria.

=== Stronger criteria ===
The Smith criterion guarantees an even stronger kind of majority rule. It says that if there is no majority-rule winner, the winner must be in the top cycle, which includes all the candidates who can beat every other candidate, either directly or indirectly. Most, but not all, Condorcet systems satisfy the top-cycle criterion.

== By method ==
=== List ===
==== Pass ====
Most sensible tournament solutions satisfy the Condorcet criterion. Other methods satisfying the criterion include:

- Black
- Kemeny-Young
- Dodgson's method
- Minimax
- Baldwin's method
- Ranked pairs
- Schulze
- Total Vote Runoff
- Tideman's alternative method

See Category:Condorcet methods for more.

==== Fail ====
The following voting systems do not satisfy the Condorcet criterion:

- Plurality voting
- Instant-runoff voting
- Borda count
- Approval Voting
- Coombs' rule
- Bucklin voting (and the closely related median voting)
- Score Voting

=== Examples of failures ===
==== Plurality voting ====
With plurality voting, the full set of voter preferences is not recorded on the ballot and so cannot be deduced therefrom (e.g. following a real election). Plurality fails the Condorcet criterion because of vote-splitting effects.

Consider an election in which 30% of the voters prefer candidate A to candidate B to candidate C and vote for A, 30% of the voters prefer C to A to B and vote for C, and 40% of the voters prefer B to A to C and vote for B. Candidate B would win (with 40% of the vote) even though A would be the Condorcet winner, beating B 60% to 40%, and C 70% to 30%.

A real-life example may be the 2000 election in Florida, where most voters preferred Al Gore to George Bush, but Bush won as a result of spoiler candidate Ralph Nader.

==== Instant-runoff voting ====
In instant-runoff voting (IRV) voters rank candidates from first to last. The last-place candidate (the one with the fewest first-place votes) is eliminated; the votes are then reassigned to the non-eliminated candidate the voter would have chosen had the candidate not been present.

Instant-runoff does not comply with the Condorcet criterion, i.e. it is possible for it to elect a candidate that could lose in a head to head contest against another candidate in the election. For example, the following vote count of preferences with three candidates {A, B, C}:

- A > B > C: 35
- C > B > A: 34
- B > C > A: 31

In this case, B is preferred to A by 65 votes to 35, and B is preferred to C by 66 to 34, so B is preferred to both A and C. B must then win according to the Condorcet criterion. Under IRV, B is ranked first by the fewest voters and is eliminated, and then C wins with the transferred votes from B.

Note that 65 voters, a majority, prefer either candidate B or C over A; since IRV passes the mutual majority criterion, it guarantees one of B and C must win. If candidate A, an irrelevant alternative under IRV, was not running, a majority of voters would consider B their 1st choice, and IRV's mutual majority compliance would thus ensure B wins.

One real-life example of instant runoff failing the Condorcet criteria was the 2009 mayoral election of Burlington, Vermont.

==== Borda count ====
Borda count is a voting system in which voters rank the candidates in an order of preference. Points are given for the position of a candidate in a voter's rank order. The candidate with the most points wins.

The Borda count does not comply with the Condorcet criterion in the following case. Consider an election consisting of five voters and three alternatives (candidates A, B, and C), with the following votes:

- A > B > C: 3
- B > C > A: 2

In this election, the Borda count awards 2 points for 1st choice, 1 point for second and 0 points for third. Thus, the total points received by each alternative is as follows:

- A: (3 * 2) + (0 * 1) + (2 * 0) = 6 + 0 + 0 = 6
- B: (2 * 2) + (3 * 1) + (0 * 0) = 4 + 3 + 0 = 7
- C: (0 * 3) + (2 * 1) + (3 * 0) = 0 + 2 + 0 = 2

With 7 points, B is the Borda count winner; however, the fact that A is preferred by three of the five voters to all other alternatives makes it a beats-all champion, and the required winner to satisfy the Condorcet criterion.

==== Bucklin/Median ====
Highest medians is a system in which the voter gives all candidates a rating out of a predetermined set (e.g. {"excellent", "good", "fair", "poor"}). The winner of the election would be the candidate with the best median rating. Consider an election with three candidates A, B, C.

- 35 voters rate candidate A "excellent", B "fair", and C "poor",
- 34 voters rate candidate C "excellent", B "fair", and A "poor", and
- 31 voters rate candidate B "excellent", C "good", and A "poor".

B is preferred to A by 65 votes to 35, and B is preferred to C by 66 to 34. Hence, B is the beats-all champion. But B only gets the median rating "fair", while C has the median rating "good"; as a result, C is chosen as the winner by highest medians.

==== Approval voting ====
Main article: Approval voting

Approval voting is a system in which the voter can approve of (or vote for) any number of candidates on a ballot. Approval voting fails the Condorcet criterion

Consider an election in which 70% of the voters prefer candidate A to candidate B to candidate C, while 30% of the voters prefer C to B to A. If every voter votes for their top two favorites, Candidate B would win (with 100% approval) even though A would be the Condorcet winner.

==== Score voting ====
Score voting is a system in which the voter gives all candidates a score on a predetermined scale (e.g. from 0 to 5). The winner of the election is the candidate with the highest total score. Score voting fails the Condorcet criterion. For example:

Candidates Votes	A	B	C
45	5/5	1/5	0/5
40	0/5	1/5	5/5
15	2/5	5/5	4/5
Average	2.55	1.6	2.6

Here, C is declared winner, even though a majority of voters would prefer B; this is because the supporters of C are much more enthusiastic about their favorite candidate than the supporters of B. The same example also shows that adding a runoff does not always cause score to comply with the criterion (as the Condorcet winner B is not in the top-two according to score).

== See also ==
- Condorcet loser criterion
- Condorcet method
- Multiwinner voting – contains information on some multiwinner variants of the Condorcet criterion.
