= Condorcet paradox =

Self-contradiction of majority rule

In social choice theory, Condorcet's voting paradox (also called Condorcet's paradox or the Condorcet paradox) is a fundamental discovery by the Marquis de Condorcet that majority rule can be self-contradictory as majority preferences can become intransitive with three or more options. For example, there can be rock-paper-scissors scenarios where a majority of voters will prefer A to B, B to C, and also C to A, even if every voter's individual preferences are rational and avoid self-contradiction. Examples of Condorcet's paradox are called Condorcet cycles or cyclic ties.

In such a cycle, every possible choice is rejected by the electorate in favor of another alternative, who is preferred by more than half of all voters. Thus, any attempt to ground social decision-making in majoritarianism must accept such self-contradictions (commonly called spoiler effects). Systems that attempt to do so, while minimizing the rate of such self-contradictions, are called Condorcet methods.

The existence of a Condorcet winner depends upon voters' preferences; every social decision-making process is subject to Condorcet's paradox.

== History ==
Condorcet's paradox was first discovered by Catalan philosopher and theologian Ramon Llull in the 13th century, during his investigations into church governance, but his work was lost until the 21st century. The mathematician and political philosopher Marquis de Condorcet rediscovered the paradox in the late 18th century.

Condorcet's discovery means he arguably identified the key result of Arrow's impossibility theorem, albeit under stronger conditions than required by Arrow: Condorcet cycles create situations where any ranked voting system that respects majorities must have a spoiler effect.

== Example ==
Suppose we have three candidates, A, B, and C, and that there are three voters with preferences as follows:

Voter	First preference	Second preference	Third preference
Voter 1	A	B	C
Voter 2	B	C	A
Voter 3	C	A	B

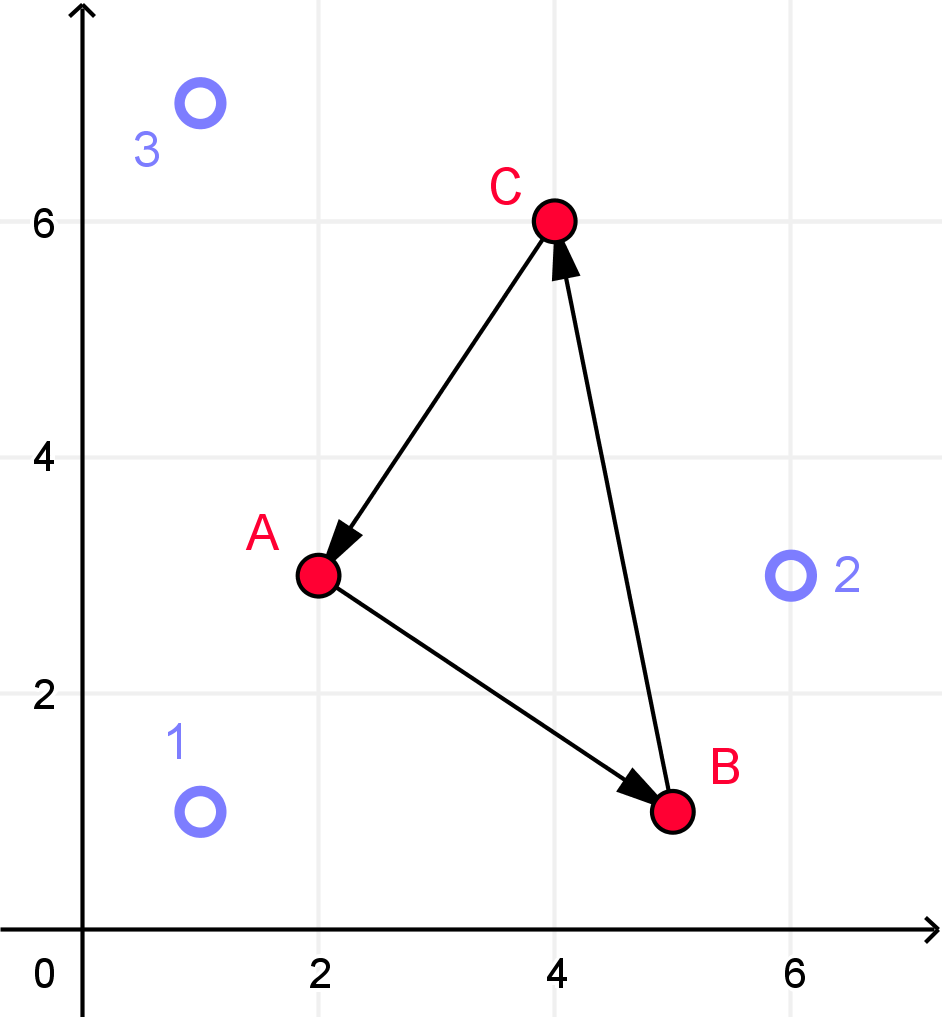
Voters (blue) and candidates (red) plotted in a 2-dimensional preference space. Each voter prefers a closer candidate over a farther. Arrows show the order in which voters prefer the candidates.

If C is chosen as the winner, it can be argued that B should win instead, since two voters (1 and 2) prefer B to C and only one voter (3) prefers C to B. However, by the same argument A is preferred to B, and C is preferred to A, by a margin of two to one on each occasion. Thus the society's preferences show cycling: A is preferred over B which is preferred over C which is preferred over A.

As a result, any attempt to appeal to the principle of majority rule will lead to logical self-contradiction. Regardless of which alternative we select, we can find another alternative that would be preferred by most voters.

=== Practical scenario ===
The voters in Cactus County prefer the incumbent county executive Alex of the Farmers' Party over rival Beatrice of the Solar Panel Party by about a 2-to-1 margin. This year a third candidate, Charlie, is running as an independent. Charlie is a wealthy and outspoken businessman, of whom the voters hold polarized views.

The voters divide into three similarly sized groups:

- Group 1 revere Charlie for saving the high school football team. They rank Charlie first, and then Alex above Beatrice as usual (CAB).
- Group 2 despise Charlie for his sharp business practices. They rank Charlie last, and then Alex above Beatrice as usual (ABC).
- Group 3 are Beatrice's core supporters. They want the Farmers' Party out of office in favor of the Solar Panel Party, and regard Charlie's candidacy as a sideshow. They rank Beatrice first and Alex last as usual, and Charlie second by default (BCA).

Therefore a majority of voters prefer Alex to Beatrice (A > B), as they always have. A majority of voters are either Beatrice-lovers or Charlie-haters, so prefer Beatrice to Charlie (B > C). And a majority of voters are either Charlie-lovers or Alex-haters, so prefer Charlie to Alex (C > A). Combining the three preferences gives us A > B > C > A, a Condorcet cycle.

== Likelihood ==
It is possible to estimate the probability of the paradox by extrapolating from real election data, or using mathematical models of voter behavior, though the results depend strongly on which model is used.

=== Impartial culture model ===
We can calculate the probability of seeing the paradox for the special case where voter preferences are uniformly distributed among the candidates. (This is the "impartial culture" model, which is known to be a "worst-case scenario"—most models show substantially lower probabilities of Condorcet cycles.)

For $n$ voters providing a preference list of three candidates A, B, C, we write $X_n$ (resp. $Y_n$, $Z_n$) the random variable equal to the number of voters who placed A in front of B (respectively B in front of C, C in front of A). The sought probability is $p_n = 2P (X_n> n / 2, Y_n> n / 2, Z_n> n / 2)$ (we double because there is also the symmetric case A> C> B> A). We show that, for odd $n$, $p_n = 3q_n-1/2$ where $q_n = P (X_n> n / 2, Y_n> n / 2)$ which makes one need to know only the joint distribution of $X_n$ and $Y_n$.

If we put $p_{n, i, j} = P (X_n = i, Y_n = j)$, we show the relation which makes it possible to compute this distribution by recurrence:

$$p_ { n + 1, i, j} = {1 \over 6} p_ {n, i, j} + {1 \over 3} p_ {n, i-1, j} + {1 \over 3} p_ {n, i, j-1} + {1 \over 6} p_ {n, i-1, j-1} .$$

The following results are then obtained:

$n$	3	101	201	301	401	501	601
$p_n$	5.556%	8.690%	8.732%	8.746%	8.753%	8.757%	8.760%

The sequence seems to be tending towards a finite limit.

Using the central limit theorem, we show that $q_n$ tends to $q = \frac{1}{4} P\left(|T| > \frac{\sqrt{2}}{4}\right),$ where $T$ is a variable following a Cauchy distribution, which gives

$$q=\dfrac{1}{2\pi }\int_{\sqrt{2}/4}^{+\infty }\frac{dt}{1+t^{2}}=\dfrac{
\arctan 2\sqrt{2}}{2\pi }=\dfrac{\arccos \frac{1}{3}}{2\pi }$$
(constant quoted in the OEIS).

The asymptotic probability of encountering the Condorcet paradox is therefore ${{3\arccos{1\over3}}\over{2\pi}}-{1\over2}={\arcsin{\sqrt 6\over 9}\over \pi}$ which gives the value 8.77%.

Some results for the case of more than three candidates have been calculated and simulated. The simulated likelihood for an impartial culture model with 25 voters increases with the number of candidates:

3	4	5	7	10
8.4%	16.6%	24.2%	35.7%	47.5%

The rise in the table with the number of candidates is the subject of one of two conjectures made in 1974 under the assumption of impartial culture. For an odd number of voters, as in the simulation above, the two conjectures can be stated as follows. If the number of candidates is fixed at three or more, the probability that a Condorcet winner exists strictly decreases when two voters are added. If the number of voters is fixed at an odd number of three or more, this probability strictly decreases when a candidate is added to an election with at least three candidates.

The likelihood of a Condorcet cycle for related models approach these values for three-candidate elections with large electorates:

- Impartial anonymous culture (IAC): 6.25%
- Uniform culture (UC): 6.25%
- Maximal culture condition (MC): 9.17%

All of these models are unrealistic, but can be investigated to establish an upper bound on the likelihood of a cycle.

=== Group coherence models ===
When modeled with more realistic voter preferences, Condorcet paradoxes in elections with a small number of candidates and a large number of voters become very rare.

=== Spatial model ===
A study of three-candidate elections analyzed 12 different models of voter behavior, and found the spatial model of voting to be the most accurate to real-world ranked-ballot election data. Analyzing this spatial model, they found the likelihood of a cycle to decrease to zero as the number of voters increases, with likelihoods of 5% for 100 voters, 0.5% for 1000 voters, and 0.06% for 10,000 voters.

Another spatial model found likelihoods of 2% or less in all simulations of 201 voters and 5 candidates, whether two or four-dimensional, with or without correlation between dimensions, and with two different dispersions of candidates.

=== Empirical studies ===
Many attempts have been made at finding empirical examples of the paradox. Empirical identification of a Condorcet paradox presupposes extensive data on the decision-makers' preferences over all alternatives—something that is only very rarely available.

While examples of the paradox seem to occur occasionally in small settings (e.g., parliaments) very few examples have been found in larger groups (e.g. electorates), although some have been identified.

A summary of 37 individual studies, covering a total of 265 real-world elections, large and small, found 25 instances of a Condorcet paradox, for a total likelihood of 9.4% (and this may be a high estimate, since cases of the paradox are more likely to be reported on than cases without).

An analysis of 883 three-candidate elections extracted from 84 real-world ranked-ballot elections of the Electoral Reform Society found a Condorcet cycle likelihood of 0.7%. These derived elections had between 350 and 1,957 voters. A similar analysis of data from the 1970–2004 American National Election Studies thermometer scale surveys found a Condorcet cycle likelihood of 0.4%. These derived elections had between 759 and 2,521 "voters".

Andrew Myers, who operates the Condorcet Internet Voting Service, analyzed 10,354 nonpolitical CIVS elections and found cycles in 17% of elections with at least 10 votes, with the figure dropping to 2.1% for elections with at least 100 votes, and 1.2% for ≥300 votes.

=== Real world instances ===
A database of 189 ranked United States elections from 2004 to 2022 contained only one Condorcet cycle: the 2021 Minneapolis City Council election in Ward 2, with a narrow circular tie between candidates of the Green Party (Cam Gordon), the Minnesota Democratic–Farmer–Labor Party (Yusra Arab), and an independent democratic socialist (Robin Wonsley). Voters' preferences were non-transitive: Arab was preferred over Gordon, Gordon over Wonsley, and Wonsley over Arab, creating a cyclical pattern with no clear winner. Additionally, the election exhibited a downward monotonicity paradox, as well as a paradox akin to Simpson’s paradox.

A second instance of a Condorcet cycle was found in the 2022 District 4 School Director election in Oakland, California. Manigo was preferred to Hutchinson, Hutchinson to Resnick, and Resnick to Manigo. Like in Minneapolis, the margins were quite narrow: for instance, 11370 voters preferred Manigo to Hutchinson while 11322 preferred Hutchinson to Manigo.

Another instance of a Condorcet cycle was with the seat of Prahran in the 2014 Victorian state election, with a narrow circular tie between the Greens, Liberal, and Labor candidates. The Greens candidate, who was initially third on primary votes, defeated the Liberal candidate by less than 300 votes. However, if the contest had been between Labor and Liberal, the Liberal candidate would have won by 25 votes. While a Greens vs Labor count was not conducted, Liberal preferences tend to flow more towards Labor than Greens in other cases (including in the seat of Richmond in the same election), meaning that Labor would have very likely been preferred to the Greens. This means there was a circular pattern, with the Greens preferred over Liberal, who were preferred over Labor, who were preferred over the Greens.

== Implications ==
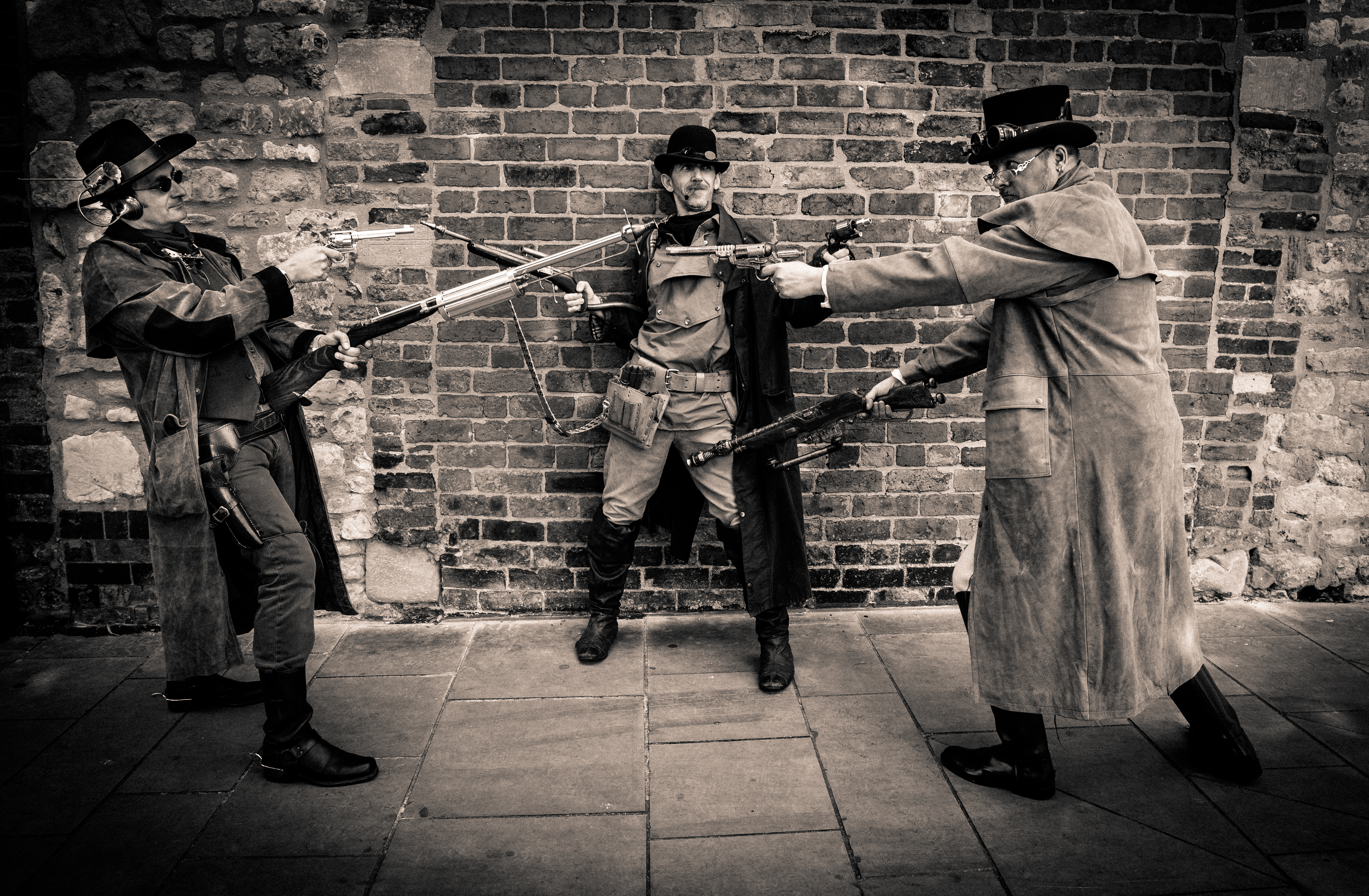
Three men portraying a Mexican standoff. Just as there is no winner in a Mexican standoff with certain combinations of gun-pointings, there is sometimes no majority-preferred winner in a ranked-ballot election.

When a Condorcet method is used to determine an election, the voting paradox of cyclical societal preferences implies that the election has no Condorcet winner: no candidate who can win a one-on-one election against each other candidate. There will still be a smallest group of candidates, known as the Smith set, such that each candidate in the group can win a one-on-one election against each of the candidates outside the group. The several variants of the Condorcet method differ on how they resolve such ambiguities when they arise to determine a winner. The Condorcet methods which always elect someone from the Smith set when there is no Condorcet winner are known as Smith-efficient. Note that using only rankings, there is no fair and deterministic resolution to the trivial example given earlier because each candidate is in an exactly symmetrical situation.

Situations having the voting paradox can cause voting mechanisms to violate the axiom of independence of irrelevant alternatives—the choice of winner by a voting mechanism could be influenced by whether or not a losing candidate is available to be voted for.

=== Two-stage voting processes ===
One important implication of the possible existence of the voting paradox in a practical situation is that in a paired voting process like those of standard parliamentary procedure, the eventual winner will depend on the way the majority votes are ordered. For example, say a popular bill is set to pass, before some other group offers an amendment; this amendment passes by majority vote. This may result in a majority of a legislature rejecting the bill as a whole, thus creating a paradox (where a popular amendment to a popular bill has made it unpopular). This logical inconsistency is the origin of the poison pill amendment, which deliberately engineers a false Condorcet cycle to kill a bill. Likewise, the order of votes in a legislature can be manipulated by the person arranging them to ensure their preferred outcome wins.

Despite frequent objections by social choice theorists about the logically incoherent results of such procedures, and the existence of better alternatives for choosing between multiple versions of a bill, the procedure of pairwise majority-rule is widely used and is codified into the by-laws or parliamentary procedures of almost every kind of deliberative assembly.

=== Spoiler effects ===
Condorcet paradoxes imply that majoritarian methods fail independence of irrelevant alternatives. Label the three candidates in a race Rock, Paper, and Scissors. In one-on-one races, Rock loses to Paper, Paper loses to Scissors, and Scissors loses to Rock.

Without loss of generality, say that Rock wins the election with a certain method. Then, Scissors is a spoiler candidate for Paper; if Scissors were to drop out, Paper would win the only one-on-one race (Paper defeats Rock). The same reasoning applies regardless of the winner.

This example also shows why Condorcet elections are rarely (if ever) spoiled; spoilers can only happen when there is no Condorcet winner. Condorcet cycles are rare in large elections, and the median voter theorem shows that cycles are impossible whenever candidates are arrayed on a left-right spectrum.

== Multiple-election paradox ==
Brams, Kilgour and Zwicker describe a related paradox for elections in which several issues are decided at once, such as the propositions in a referendum or the offices filled on the same ballot. Each issue is decided separately by majority, and the outcomes taken together form the winning combination. The paradox of multiple elections occurs when the winning combination receives the fewest votes, or ties for the fewest, among all the combinations a voter could have chosen.

In their smallest example without ties, 13 voters vote yes (Y) or no (N) on three propositions. One voter each chooses YYY, YYN, YNY and NYY; three voters each choose YNN, NYN and NNY; and no voter chooses NNN. Each proposition fails by 7 votes to 6, so the winning combination is NNN, the only combination that no voter chose. With four propositions a complete-reversal version is possible, in which the combination exactly opposite to the winning one receives the most votes.

Brams, Kilgour and Zwicker found the paradox in real voting data. On the 28 statewide propositions of the 1990 California general election, none of the roughly 1.8 million voters in Los Angeles County voted on the winning side of every proposition. They note that with more than 268 million possible yes–no combinations this result is not surprising in itself. They also treat divided government as a milder form of the same discrepancy. In 1980 the Republicans won the presidency and the Senate while the Democrats kept the House, and when counted by congressional district this combination ranked only fourth of the eight possible.

The link to the Condorcet paradox comes from treating the pairwise majority votes among three alternatives as three yes-or-no questions: does a voter prefer a to b, b to c, and c to a? A voter with transitive preferences never answers YYY or NNN, since those answers describe a cycle. When majorities are cyclic, however, the question-by-question winner is YYY or NNN, so it is a combination that no voter chose. On this basis Brams, Kilgour and Zwicker show that, when voters have transitive preferences, every Condorcet paradox corresponds to a multiple-election paradox. The converse holds for three alternatives but fails for four or more, so the multiple-election paradox generalizes the Condorcet paradox. They illustrate the correspondence with William H. Riker's reconstruction of the preferences behind the 1846 votes in the House of Representatives on the Wilmot Proviso, in which majorities were cyclic. As possible remedies, they discuss letting voters vote directly for combinations, using approval voting or the Borda count.

Later work extended the analysis. Saari and Sieberg developed a geometric method that identifies every voter profile consistent with given results on separate initiatives or on a bundled bill, and related the resulting discrepancies to Simpson's paradox and Arrow's impossibility theorem. Lacy and Niou showed that when some voters have nonseparable preferences across several yes-or-no issues, issue-by-issue majority voting may fail to select a Condorcet-winning set of outcomes even when one exists, and may instead select a Condorcet loser.

== See also ==
- Arrow's impossibility theorem
- Discursive dilemma
- Spoiler effect
- Independence of irrelevant alternatives
- McKelvey–Schofield chaos theorem
- Nakamura number
- Quadratic voting
- Rock paper scissors
- Smith set
