= Impartial culture =

Probabilistic model

Impartial culture (IC), or the culture of indifference, is a probabilistic model used in social choice theory for analyzing ranked voting method rules.

The model is understood to be unrealistic, and not a good representation of real-world voting behavior, however, it is useful for mathematical comparisons of voting methods under reproducible, worst-case scenarios.

The model assumes that each voter provides a complete strict ranking of all the candidates (with no equal rankings or blanks), which is drawn from a set of all possible rankings. For $m$ candidates, there are $m!$ possible strict rankings (permutations).

There are three variations of the model that use different subsets of the full set of possible rankings, so that different election permutations are drawn with different probabilities:

== Impartial culture ==
This model assumes that each voter's ranking is randomly selected from a uniform distribution. If these are chosen by $n$ voters, there are thus $m!^n$ possible elections ("preference profiles").

== Impartial anonymous culture ==
This reduces the set of possible elections by eliminating those that are equivalent if the voter identities are unknown. For example, the two-candidate, three-voter election {A>B, A>B, B>A} is equivalent to the election where the second and third voters swap votes: {A>B, B>A, A>B}, and so all variations on this set of votes are only included once. The set of all such elections is called the anonymous equivalence class (AEC), and if the strict rankings are being chosen by $n$ voters, there are $\left ( \frac {n+m!-1} {m!-1} \right )$ possible elections.

This is also referred to as the "Dirichlet" or "simplex" model.

== Impartial, anonymous, and neutral culture ==
This reduces the set of possible elections further, by eliminating those that are equivalent if the candidate identities are unknown. For example, the two-candidate, three-voter election {A>B, A>B, B>A} is equivalent to the election where the two candidates are swapped: {B>A, B>A, A>B}.
