= Participation criterion =

Principle that voting for a candidate should help them

The participation criterion is a voting system criterion that says candidates should never lose an election as a result of receiving "too many votes". More formally, it says that adding more voters who prefer Alice to Bob should not cause Alice to lose the election to Bob.

Voting systems that fail the participation criterion exhibit the no-show paradox, where a voter is effectively disenfranchised by the electoral system because turning out to vote would make the result worse for them. Such voters are sometimes referred to as having negative vote weights, particularly in the context of German constitutional law, where courts have ruled it violates the principle of one man, one vote.

Positional methods and score voting satisfy the participation criterion. All deterministic voting rules that satisfy pairwise majority-rule can fail in situations involving four-way cyclic ties, though such scenarios are empirically rare, and the randomized Condorcet rule satisfies one generalization of the rule. The majority judgment rule fails as well. Instant-runoff voting and the two-round system both experience the no-show paradox frequently in competitive elections, often as a result of a center squeeze.

The no-show paradox is similar to, but not the same as, the perverse response paradox. Perverse response happens when an existing voter can make a candidate win by decreasing their rating of that candidate (or vice-versa). For example, under instant-runoff voting, moving a candidate from first-place to last-place on a ballot can cause them to win.

== Noncompliant methods ==
=== Instant-runoff (ranked-choice) voting ===
The most common cause of no-show paradoxes is the use of instant-runoff (often called ranked-choice voting in the United States). In instant-runoff voting, a no-show paradox can occur even in elections with only three candidates, and occur in 50%-60% of all 3-candidate elections where the results of IRV disagree with those of plurality.

A notable example is given in the 2009 Burlington mayoral election, the United States' second instant-runoff election in the modern era, where Bob Kiss won the election as a result of 750 ballots ranking him in last place.

An example with three parties (Top, Center, Bottom) is shown below. In this scenario, the Center party initially wins. However, say that a group of pro-Top voters joins the election, all of whom cast their ballots with the ranking Top > Center > Bottom:

Baseline				More votes ranking Center > Bottom		
	Round 1	Round 2			Round 1	Round 2
Top	~~25~~		+6	Top	31	46
Center	30	55		Center	~~30~~	
Bottom	39	39		Bottom	39	54

The participation criterion says that the addition of voters who prefer Center over Bottom should not cause Bottom to win. Yet the increase in support for the Top party allows it to defeat the Center party in the first round. As a result, 15 votes that previously counted toward Center now count toward their second preference, Bottom, which is enough to give Bottom the victory. This makes the election an example of a center-squeeze, a class of elections where instant-runoff and plurality have difficulty electing the majority-preferred candidate.

=== Condorcet methods ===
When there are at most 3 major candidates, Minimax Condorcet and its variants (such as ranked pairs and Schulze's method) satisfy the participation criterion. However, with more than 3 candidates, Hervé Moulin proved that every deterministic Condorcet method can sometimes fail participation. Similar incompatibilities have also been shown for set-valued voting rules. The randomized Condorcet rule satisfies the criterion, but fails the closely related monotonicity criterion in situations with Condorcet cycles.

Studies suggest such failures may be empirically rare, however. One study surveying 306 publicly available election datasets found no participation failures for methods in the ranked pairs-minimax family.

In addition to participation, an even more severe paradox property can occur with Condorcet's principle: it may be better for a voter to submit a completely reversed ballot than to submit a ballot that ranks all candidates honestly.

=== Implementations of proportional representation ===
Some proportional representation systems allow for no-show paradoxes. Rules based on the Droop quota (including all current implementations of the single transferable vote) allow for no-show paradoxes.

Hamilton's method exhibits a milder form of the paradox called the population paradox, but does not have a true no-show paradox. However, adding an electoral threshold produces a no-show paradox.

==== In Germany ====
In Germany, situations where a voter's ballot has the opposite of its intended effect (e.g. a vote for a party or candidate causes them to lose) are called negatives Stimmgewicht (lit. 'negative voting weights'). An infamous example occurred in the 2005 German federal election, when an article in Der Spiegel laid out how CDU voters in Dresden I would have to vote against their own party if they wished to avoid losing a seat in the Bundestag. This led to a lawsuit by electoral reform organization Mehr Demokratie and Alliance 90/The Greens, joined by the neo-Nazi NPD of Germany, who argued the election law was unconstitutionally undemocratic.

The Federal Constitutional Court agreed with the plaintiffs, ruling that negative vote weights violate the German constitution's guarantee of equal and direct suffrage. The majority wrote that:

A seat allocation procedure that allows an increase in votes to lead to a loss of seats, or results in more seats being won if [proportionally] fewer votes are cast for it, contradicts the meaning and purpose of a democratic election[...]

Such nonsensical relationships between voting and electoral success not only impair the equality of the right to vote and the equal opportunities of the parties, but also the principle of a popular election, as it is no longer apparent to the voter how their vote results in the success or failure of a candidate.[...]

Negative vote weights cannot be accepted as constitutional on the premise that they cannot be predicted or planned, and thus can hardly be influenced by the individual voter. To what extent this is true can be set aside, as such arbitrary results make a mockery of the democratic competition for support from the electorate.

The ruling forced the Bundestag to abandon its old practice of ignoring overhang seats, and instead adopt a new system of compensation involving leveling seats.

=== Quorum requirements ===
A common cause of no-show paradoxes is the use of a quorum. For example, if a public referendum requires 50% turnout to be binding, additional "no" votes may push turnout above 50%, causing the measure to pass. A referendum that instead required a minimum number of yes votes (e.g. >25% of the population voting "yes") would pass the participation criterion.

Many representative bodies have quorum requirements where the same dynamic can be at play. For example, the requirement for a two-thirds quorum in the Oregon Legislative Assembly effectively creates an unofficial two-thirds supermajority requirement for passing bills, and can result in a law passing if too many senators turn out to oppose it. Deliberate ballot-spoiling strategies have been successful in ensuring referendums remain non-binding, as in the 2023 Polish referendum.

== Manipulation ==
The participation criterion can also be justified as a weaker form of strategyproofness: while it is impossible for honesty to always be the best strategy (by Gibbard's theorem), the participation criterion guarantees honesty will always be an effective, rather than actively counterproductive, strategy (i.e. a voter can always safely cast a sincere vote). This can be particularly effective for encouraging honest voting if voters exhibit loss aversion. Rules with no-show paradoxes do not always allow voters to cast a sincere vote; for example, a sincere Palin > Begich > Peltola voter in the 2022 Alaska special election would have been better off if they had not shown up at all, rather than casting an honest vote.

While no-show paradoxes can be deliberately exploited as a kind of strategic voting, systems that fail the participation criterion are typically considered to be undesirable because they expose the underlying system as logically incoherent or "spiteful" (actively seeking to violate the preferences of some voters).

=== Quorum-busting ===
Quorum-busting, also known as a walkout, is a tactic that prevents a legislative body from attaining a quorum, and can be used by a minority group seeking to block the adoption of some measure they oppose. This generally only happens where the quorum is a super-majority, as quorums of a majority or less of the membership mean that the support of a majority of members is always sufficient for the quorum (as well as for passage). Rules to discourage quorum-busting have been adopted by legislative bodies, such as the call of the house, outlined above.

Quorum-busting has been used for centuries. For instance, in 1840 during his time in the Illinois Legislature, Abraham Lincoln leapt out of a first story window (the doors of the Capitol had been locked to prevent legislators from fleeing) in a failed attempt to prevent a quorum from being present.

== Examples ==
=== Majority judgment ===
This example shows that majority judgment violates the participation criterion. Assume two candidates A and B with 5 potential voters and the following ratings:

Candidates		# of voters
A	B	# of voters
Excellent	Good	2
Fair	Poor	2
Poor	Good	1

The two voters rating A "Excellent" are unsure whether to participate in the election.

==== Voters not participating ====
Assume the 2 voters would not show up at the polling place.

The ratings of the remaining 3 voters would be:

Candidates		# of voters
A	B	# of voters
Fair	Poor	2
Poor	Good	1

The sorted ratings would be as follows:

Candidate	↓ / Median point
A
B
	Excellent / Good / Fair / Poor

Result: A has the median rating of "Fair" and B has the median rating of "Poor". Thus, A is elected majority judgment winner.

==== Voters participating ====
Now, consider the 2 voters decide to participate:

Candidates		# of voters
A	B	# of voters
Excellent	Good	2
Fair	Poor	2
Poor	Good	1

The sorted ratings would be as follows:

Candidate	↓ / Median point
A
B
	Excellent / Good / Fair / Poor

Result: A has the median rating of "Fair" and B has the median rating of "Good". Thus, B is the majority judgment winner.

=== Condorcet methods ===
This example shows how Condorcet methods can violate the participation criterion when there is a preference paradox. Assume four candidates A, B, C and D with 26 potential voters and the following preferences:

Preferences	# of voters
A > D > B > C	8
B > C > A > D	7
C > D > B > A	7

This gives the pairwise counting method:

Pairwise election results
X Y	A	B	C	D
A		14 8	14 8	7 15
B	8 14		7 15	15 7
C	8 14	15 7		8 14
D	15 7	7 15	14 8	
Pairwise results for X, won-tied-lost	1-0-2	2-0-1	2-0-1	1-0-2

The sorted list of victories would be:

Pair	Winner
A (15) vs. D (7)	A 15
B (15) vs. C (7)	B 15
B (7) vs. D (15)	D 15
A (8) vs. B (14)	B 14
A (8) vs. C (14)	C 14
C (14) vs. D (8)	C 14

Result: A > D, B > C and D > B are locked in (and the other three can't be locked in after that), so the full ranking is A > D > B > C. Thus, A is elected ranked pairs winner.

==== Voters participating ====
Now, assume an extra 4 voters, in the top row, decide to participate:

Preferences	# of voters
A > B > C > D	4
A > D > B > C	8
B > C > A > D	7
C > D > B > A	7

The results would be tabulated as follows:

Pairwise election results
X Y	A	B	C	D
A		14 12	14 12	7 19
B	12 14		7 19	15 11
C	12 14	19 7		8 18
D	19 7	11 15	18 8	
Pairwise results for X, won-tied-lost	1-0-2	2-0-1	2-0-1	1-0-2

The sorted list of victories would be:

Pair	Winner
A (19) vs. D (7)	A 19
B (19) vs. C (7)	B 19
C (18) vs. D (8)	C 18
B (11) vs. D (15)	D 15
A (12) vs. B (14)	B 14
A (12) vs. C (14)	C 14

Result: A > D, B > C and C > D are locked in first. Now, D > B can't be locked in since it would create a cycle B > C > D > B. Finally, B > A and C > A are locked in. Hence, the full ranking is B > C > A > D. Thus, B is elected ranked pairs winner by adding a set of voters who prefer A to B.

== See also ==
- Consistency criterion – Property of electoral systems
- Electoral system – Method by which voters make a choice between options
- Non-negative responsiveness – Electoral pathology or paradox
