= Independence of irrelevant alternatives =

Axiom of decision theory and social sciences

Independence of irrelevant alternatives (IIA) is an axiom of decision theory which codifies the intuition that a choice between $A$ and $B$ (which are both related) should not depend on the quality of a third, unrelated outcome $C$. There are several different variations of this axiom, which are generally equivalent under mild conditions. As a result of its importance, the axiom has been independently rediscovered in various forms across a wide variety of fields, including economics, cognitive science, social choice, fair division, rational choice, artificial intelligence, probability, and game theory. It is closely tied to many of the most important theorems in these fields, including Arrow's impossibility theorem, the Balinski–Young theorem, and the money pump arguments.

In behavioral economics, failures of IIA (caused by irrationality) are called menu effects or menu dependence.

== Motivation ==
IIA is sometimes illustrated with a short joke attributed, perhaps apocryphally, to philosopher Sidney Morgenbesser:

Morgenbesser, ordering dessert, is told by a waitress that he can choose between blueberry or apple pie. He orders apple. Soon the waitress comes back and explains cherry pie is also an option. Morgenbesser replies "In that case, I'll have blueberry."

IIA rules out this kind of arbitrary behavior, by stating that:

If A(pple) is chosen over B(lueberry) in the choice set {A, B}, introducing a third option C(herry) must not result in B being chosen over A.

== By field ==
=== Economics ===
In economics, the axiom is connected to the theory of revealed preferences. Economists often invoke IIA when building descriptive (positive) models to ensure agents have well-defined preferences that can be used for making testable predictions. If agents' behavior or preferences are allowed to change depending on irrelevant circumstances, any model could be made unfalsifiable by claiming some irrelevant circumstance must have changed when repeating the experiment. Often, the axiom is justified by arguing that any irrational agent will be money pumped until going bankrupt, making their preferences unobservable or irrelevant to the rest of the economy.

==== Behavioral economics ====
While economists must often make do with assuming IIA for reasons of computation or to make sure they are addressing a well-posed problem, experimental economists have shown that real human decisions often violate IIA. For example, the decoy effect shows that inserting a $5 medium soda between a $3 small and $5.10 large can make customers perceive the large as a better deal (because it's "only 10 cents more than the medium"). Behavioral economics introduces models that weaken or remove many assumptions of consumer rationality, including IIA. This provides greater accuracy, at the cost of making the model more complex and more difficult to falsify.

=== Social choice ===
In social choice theory, independence of irrelevant alternatives is often stated as "if one candidate ($X$) would win an election without a new candidate ($Y$), and $Y$ is added to the ballot, then either $X$ or $Y$ should win the election." Arrow's impossibility theorem shows that no reasonable (non-random, non-dictatorial) ranked voting system can satisfy IIA. However, Arrow's theorem does not apply to rated voting methods. These can pass IIA under certain assumptions, but fail it if they are not met.

Specific candidates that change the outcome without winning are called spoilers.

Methods that unconditionally pass IIA include sortition and random dictatorship.

==== Common voting methods ====
Deterministic voting methods that behave like majority rule when there are only two candidates can be shown to fail IIA by the use of a Condorcet cycle:

Consider a scenario in which there are three candidates $A$, $B$, and $C$, and the voters' preferences are as follows:

25% of the voters prefer $A$ over $B$, and $B$ over $C$. ($A > B > C$)
40% of the voters prefer $B$ over $C$, and $C$ over $A$. ($B > C > A$)
35% of the voters prefer $C$ over $A$, and $A$ over $B$. ($C > A > B$)

(These are preferences, not votes, and thus are independent of the voting method.)

75% prefer $C$ over $A$, 65% prefer $B$ over $C$, and 60% prefer $A$ over $B$. The presence of this societal intransitivity is the voting paradox. Regardless of the voting method and the actual votes, there are only three cases to consider:

- Case 1: $A$ is elected. IIA is violated because the 75% who prefer $C$ over $A$ would elect $C$ if $B$ were not a candidate.
- Case 2: $B$ is elected. IIA is violated because the 60% who prefer $A$ over $B$ would elect $A$ if $C$ were not a candidate.
- Case 3: $C$ is elected. IIA is violated because the 65% who prefer $B$ over $C$ would elect $B$ if $A$ were not a candidate.

For particular voting methods, the following results hold:

- Instant-runoff voting, the Kemeny–Young method, the Minimax Condorcet method, Ranked Pairs, top-two runoff, First-past-the-post, and the Schulze method all elect $B$ in the scenario above, and thus fail IIA after $C$ is removed.
- The Borda count and Bucklin voting both elect $C$ in the scenario above, and thus fail IIA after $A$ is removed.
- Copeland's method returns a three-way tie, but can be shown to fail IIA by going in the opposite direction. If $A$ were not a candidate, then $B$ would win outright. Introducing $A$ changes the outcome into a three-way tie. So the introduction of $A$ makes $C$ no longer a loser, which is a failure.

==== Rated methods ====
Generalizations of Arrow's impossibility theorem show that if the voters change their rating scales depending on the candidates who are running, the outcome of cardinal voting may still be affected by the presence of non-winning candidates. Approval voting, score voting, and median voting may satisfy the IIA criterion if it is assumed that voters rate candidates individually and independently of knowing the available alternatives in the election, using their own absolute scale. If voters do not behave in accordance with this assumption, then those methods also fail the IIA criterion.

Balinski and Laraki disputed that any interpersonal comparisons are required for rated voting rules to pass IIA. They argue the availability of a common language with verbal grades is sufficient for IIA by allowing voters to give consistent responses to questions about candidate quality. In other words, they argue most voters will not change their beliefs about whether a candidate is "good", "bad", or "neutral" simply because another candidate joins or drops out of a race.

== Criticism of IIA ==
Arguments have been made that IIA is itself an undesirable and/or unrealistic criterion. IIA is largely incompatible with the majority criterion unless there are only two alternatives and the vast majority of voting systems fail the criteria. The satisfaction of IIA by Approval and Range voting rests on making an unrealistic assumption that voters who have meaningful preferences between two alternatives, but would approve or rate those two alternatives the same in an election with other irrelevant alternatives, would necessarily either cast a vote in which both alternatives are still approved or rated the same, or abstain, even in an election between only those two alternatives. If it is assumed to be at least possible that any voter having preferences might not abstain, or vote their favorite and least favorite candidates at differing ratings respectively, then these systems would also fail IIA. Allowing either of these conditions alone causes approval and range voting to fail IIA.

The satisfaction of IIA leaves only voting methods that are undesirable in some other way, such as treating one of the voters as a dictator, or requires making unrealistic assumptions about voter behavior.

=== In individual choice ===
Amartya Sen argued that seemingly independent alternatives could provide context for individual choice, and thus that menu dependence might not be irrational.

As an example, he described a person considering whether to take an apple out of a basket without being greedy. If the only two options available are "take the apple" or "don't take the apple", this person may conclude that there is only one apple left and so refrain from taking the last apple as they don't want to be greedy. However, if a third option "take another apple" were available, that would provide context that there are more apples in the basket, and they would then be free to take the first apple.

== Bibliography ==
- Arrow, Kenneth Joseph (1963). Social Choice and Individual Values (2nd ed.). Wiley.
- Kennedy, Peter (2003). A Guide to Econometrics (5th ed.). MIT Press. ISBN 978-0-262-61183-1.
- Maddala, G. S. (1983). Limited-Dependent and Qualitative Variables in Econometrics. Cambridge University Press. ISBN 978-1-107-78241-9.
- Ray, Paramesh (1973). "Independence from Irrelevant Alternatives". Econometrica. 41 (5): 987–991. doi:10.2307/1913820. JSTOR 1913820. Discusses and deduces the not always recognized differences between various formulations of IIA.
- Callander, Steven; Wilson, Catherine H. (July 2006). "Context-dependent voting". Quarterly Journal of Political Science. 1 (3). Now Publishing Inc.: 227–254. doi:10.1561/100.00000007.
- Steenburgh, Thomas J. (2008). "The Invariant Proportion of Substitution Property (IPS) of Discrete-Choice Models" (PDF). Marketing Science. 27 (2): 300–307. doi:10.1287/mksc.1070.0301. S2CID 207229327. Archived from the original (PDF) on 2010-06-15.
- Sen, Amartya (1994). "The Formulation of Rational Choice". The American Economic Review. 84 (2): 385–390. JSTOR 2117864.
- Sen, Amartya (July 1997). "Maximization and the Act of Choice". Econometrica. 65 (4): 745–779. doi:10.2307/2171939. JSTOR 2171939.
- Sen, Amartya (2002). Rationality and Freedom. Harvard University Press. ISBN 978-0-674-01351-3.
- Saini, Ritesh (2008). Menu dependence in risky choice (Thesis). OCLC 857236573.
- Volić, Ismar (2024). Making Democracy Count: How Mathematics Improves Voting, Electoral Maps and Representation. Princeton University Press. pp. 84–85. ISBN 978-0-691-24880-6.
