= Majority loser criterion =

Electoral voting system criterion

The majority loser criterion is a criterion to evaluate single-winner voting systems. The criterion states that if a majority of voters give a candidate no support, i.e. do not list that candidate on their ballot, that candidate must lose (unless no candidate is accepted by a majority of voters).

Either of the Condorcet loser criterion or the mutual majority criterion implies the majority loser criterion. However, the Condorcet criterion does not imply the majority loser criterion, since the minimax method satisfies the Condorcet but not the majority loser criterion. Also, the majority criterion is logically independent from the majority loser criterion, since the plurality rule satisfies the majority but not the majority loser criterion, and the anti-plurality rule satisfies the majority loser but not the majority criterion. There is no positional scoring rule which satisfies both the majority and the majority loser criterion, but several non-positional rules, including many Condorcet rules, do satisfy both. Some voting systems, like instant-runoff voting, fail the criterion if extended to handle incomplete ballots.

== See also ==
- Majority criterion
- Mutual majority criterion
- Voting system
