= Comparison of electoral systems =

Comparative politics for electoral systems

This article discusses the methods and results of comparing different electoral systems. There are two broad methods to compare voting systems:

1. Metrics of voter satisfaction, either through simulation or survey.
2. Adherence to logical criteria.

== Evaluation by metrics ==
=== Models of the electoral process ===
Voting methods can be evaluated by measuring their accuracy under random simulated elections aiming to be faithful to the properties of elections in real life. The first such evaluation was conducted by Chamberlin and Cohen in 1978, who measured the frequency with which certain non-Condorcet systems elected Condorcet winners.

==== Condorcet jury model ====
The Marquis de Condorcet viewed elections as analogous to jury votes where each member expresses an independent judgement on the quality of candidates. Candidates differ in terms of their objective merit, but voters have imperfect information about the relative merits of the candidates. Such jury models are sometimes known as valence models. Condorcet and his contemporary Laplace demonstrated that, in such a model, voting theory could be reduced to probability by finding the expected quality of each candidate.

The jury model implies several natural concepts of accuracy for voting systems under different models:

1. If voters' evaluations have errors following a normal distribution, the ideal procedure is score voting.
2. If only ranking information is available, and there are many more voters than candidates, any Condorcet method will converge on a single Condorcet winner, who will have the highest probability of being the best candidate.

However, Condorcet's model is based on the extremely strong assumption of independent errors, i.e. voters will not be systematically biased in favor of one group of candidates or another. This is usually unrealistic: voters tend to communicate with each other, form parties or political ideologies, and engage in other behaviors that can result in correlated errors.

==== Black's spatial model ====
Duncan Black proposed a one-dimensional spatial model of voting in 1948, viewing elections as ideologically driven. His ideas were later expanded by Anthony Downs. Voters' opinions are regarded as positions in a space of one or more dimensions; candidates have positions in the same space; and voters choose candidates in order of proximity (measured under Euclidean distance or some other metric).

Spatial models imply a different notion of merit for voting systems: the more acceptable the winning candidate may be as a location parameter for the voter distribution, the better the system. A political spectrum is a one-dimensional spatial model.

==== Neutral models ====
Neutral voting models try to minimize the number of parameters. The most common such model is the impartial anonymous culture model (or Dirichlet model). These models assume voters assign each candidate a utility completely at random (from a uniform distribution).

==== Comparisons of models ====
Tideman and Plassmann conducted a study which showed that a two-dimensional spatial model gave a reasonable fit to 3-candidate reductions of a large set of electoral rankings. Jury models, neutral models, and one-dimensional spatial models were all inadequate. They looked at Condorcet cycles in voter preferences (an example of which is A being preferred to B by a majority of voters, B to C and C to A) and found that the number of them was consistent with small-sample effects, concluding that "voting cycles will occur very rarely, if at all, in elections with many voters." The relevance of sample size had been studied previously by Gordon Tullock, who argued graphically that although finite electorates will be prone to cycles, the area in which candidates may give rise to cycling shrinks as the number of voters increases.

==== Utilitarian models ====
A utilitarian model views voters as ranking candidates in order of utility. The rightful winner, under this model, is the candidate who maximizes overall social utility. A utilitarian model differs from a spatial model in several important ways:

- It requires the additional assumption that voters are motivated solely by informed self-interest, with no ideological taint to their preferences.
- It requires the distance metric of a spatial model to be replaced by a faithful measure of utility.
- Consequently, the metric will need to differ between voters. It often happens that one group of voters will be powerfully affected by the choice between two candidates while another group has little at stake; the metric will then need to be highly asymmetric.

It follows from the last property that no voting system which gives equal influence to all voters is likely to achieve maximum social utility. Extreme cases of conflict between the claims of utilitarianism and democracy are referred to as the 'tyranny of the majority'. See Laslier's, Merlin's, and Nurmi's comments in Laslier's write-up.

James Mill seems to have been the first to claim the existence of an a priori connection between democracy and utilitarianism – see the Stanford Encyclopedia article.

=== Comparisons under a jury model ===
Suppose that the i^{th} candidate in an election has merit x_{i} (we may assume that x_{i} ~ N (0,σ^{2})), and that voter j 's level of approval for candidate i may be written as x_{i} + ε_{ij} (we will assume that the ε_{ij} are iid. N (0,τ^{2})). We assume that a voter ranks candidates in decreasing order of approval. We may interpret ε_{ij} as the error in voter j 's valuation of candidate i and regard a voting method as having the task of finding the candidate of greatest merit.

Each voter will rank the better of two candidates higher than the less good with a determinate probability p (which under the normal model outlined here is equal to $\tfrac{1}{2}\!+\!\tfrac{1}{\pi}\textrm{tan}^{-1}\tfrac{\sigma}{\tau}$, as can be confirmed from a standard formula for Gaussian integrals over a quadrant). Condorcet's jury theorem shows that so long as p > 1/2, the majority vote of a jury will be a better guide to the relative merits of two candidates than is the opinion of any single member.

Peyton Young showed that three further properties apply to votes between arbitrary numbers of candidates, suggesting that Condorcet was aware of the first and third of them.

- If p is close to 1/2, then the Borda winner is the maximum likelihood estimator of the best candidate.
- if p is close to 1, then the Minimax winner is the maximum likelihood estimator of the best candidate.
- For any p, the Kemeny-Young ranking is the maximum likelihood estimator of the true order of merit.

Robert F. Bordley constructed a 'utilitarian' model which is a slight variant of Condorcet's jury model. He viewed the task of a voting method as that of finding the candidate who has the greatest total approval from the electorate, i.e. the highest sum of individual voters' levels of approval. This model makes sense even with σ^{2} = 0, in which case p takes the value $\tfrac{1}{2}\!+\!\tfrac{1}{\pi}\textrm{tan}^{-1}\tfrac{1}{n-1}$ where n is the number of voters. He performed an evaluation under this model, finding as expected that the Borda count was most accurate.

=== Simulated elections under spatial models ===
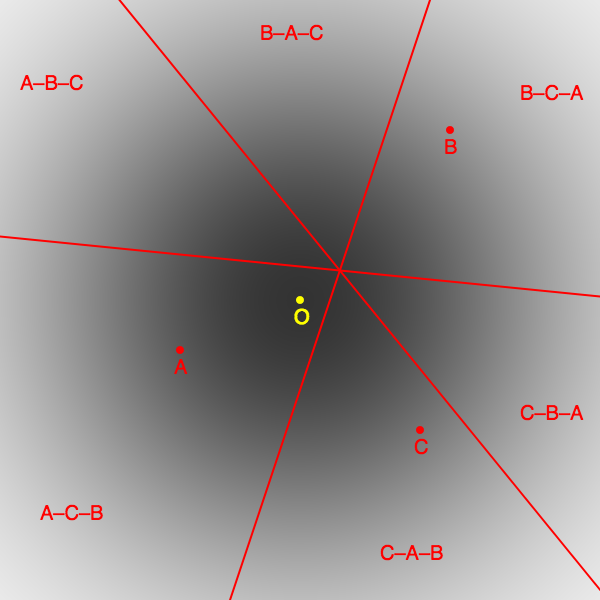
A simulated election in two dimensions

A simulated election can be constructed from a distribution of voters in a suitable space. The illustration shows voters satisfying a bivariate Gaussian distribution centred on O. There are 3 randomly generated candidates, A, B and C. The space is divided into 6 segments by 3 lines, with the voters in each segment having the same candidate preferences. The proportion of voters ordering the candidates in any way is given by the integral of the voter distribution over the associated segment.

The proportions corresponding to the 6 possible orderings of candidates determine the results yielded by different voting systems. Those which elect the best candidate, i.e. the candidate closest to O (who in this case is A), are considered to have given a correct result, and those which elect someone else have exhibited an error. By looking at results for large numbers of randomly generated candidates the empirical properties of voting systems can be measured.

The evaluation protocol outlined here is modelled on the one described by Tideman and Plassmann. Evaluations of this type are commonest for single-winner electoral systems. Ranked voting systems fit most naturally into the framework, but other types of ballot (such a FPTP and approval voting) can be accommodated with lesser or greater effort.

The evaluation protocol can be varied in a number of ways:

- The number of voters can be made finite and varied in size. In practice this is almost always done in multivariate models, with voters being sampled from their distribution and results for large electorates being used to show limiting behaviour.
- The number of candidates can be varied.
- The voter distribution could be varied; for instance, the effect of asymmetric distributions could be examined. A minor departure from normality is entailed by random sampling effects when the number of voters is finite. More systematic departures (seemingly taking the form of a Gaussian mixture model) were investigated by Jameson Quinn in 2017.

==== Evaluation for accuracy ====
m method	3	6	10	15	25	40
FPTP	70.6	35.5	21.1	14.5	9.3	6.4
AV/IRV	85.2	50.1	31.5	21.6	12.9	7.9
Borda	87.6	82.1	74.2	67.0	58.3	50.1
Condorcet	100.0	100.0	100.0	100.0	100.0	100.0

One of the main uses of evaluations is to compare the accuracy of voting systems when voters vote sincerely. If an infinite number of voters satisfy a Gaussian distribution, then the rightful winner of an election can be taken to be the candidate closest to the mean/median, and the accuracy of a method can be identified with the proportion of elections in which the rightful winner is elected. The median voter theorem guarantees that all Condorcet systems will give 100% accuracy (and the same applies to Coombs' method).

Evaluations published in research papers use multidimensional Gaussians, making the calculation numerically difficult. The number of voters is kept finite and the number of candidates is necessarily small.

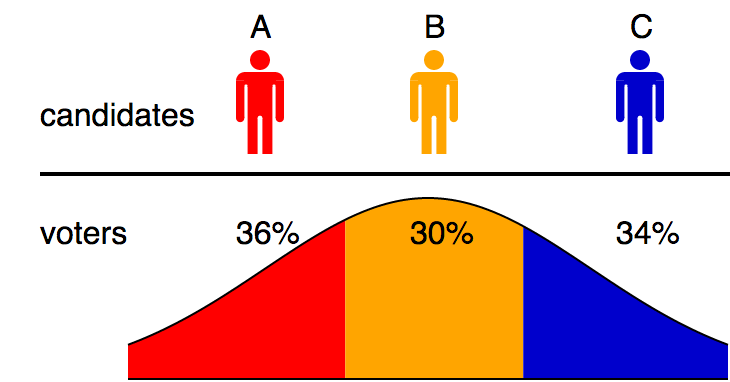
B is eliminated in the first round under IRV

The computation is much more straightforward in a single dimension, which allows an infinite number of voters and an arbitrary number m of candidates. Results for this simple case are shown in the first table, which is directly comparable with Table 5 (1000 voters, medium dispersion) of the cited paper by Chamberlin and Cohen. The candidates were sampled randomly from the voter distribution and a single Condorcet method (minimax) was included in the trials for confirmation.

m method	10
FPTP	0.166
AV/IRV	0.058
Borda	0.016
Condorcet	0.010

The relatively poor performance of the alternative vote (IRV) is explained by the well known and common source of error illustrated by the diagram, in which the election satisfies a univariate spatial model and the rightful winner B will be eliminated in the first round. A similar problem exists in all dimensions.

An alternative measure of accuracy is the average distance of voters from the winner (in which smaller means better). This is unlikely to change the ranking of voting methods, but is preferred by people who interpret distance as disutility. The second table shows the average distance (in standard deviations) minus $\sqrt\tfrac{2}{\pi}$ (which is the average distance of a variate from the centre of a standard Gaussian distribution) for 10 candidates under the same model.

==== Evaluation for resistance to tactical voting ====
James Green-Armytage et al. published a study in which they assessed the vulnerability of several voting systems to manipulation by voters. They say little about how they adapted their evaluation for this purpose, mentioning simply that it "requires creative programming". An earlier paper by the first author gives a little more detail.

The number of candidates in their simulated elections was limited to 3. This removes the distinction between certain systems; for instance Black's method and the Dasgupta-Maskin method are equivalent on 3 candidates.

The conclusions from the study are hard to summarise, but the Borda count performed badly; minimax was somewhat vulnerable; and IRV was highly resistant. The authors showed that limiting any method to elections with no Condorcet winner (choosing the Condorcet winner when there was one) would never increase its susceptibility to tactical voting. They reported that the 'Condorcet-Hare' system which uses IRV as a tie-break for elections not resolved by the Condorcet criterion was as resistant to tactical voting as IRV on its own and more accurate. Condorcet-Hare is equivalent to Copeland's method with an IRV tie-break in elections with 3 candidates.

==== Evaluation for the effect of the candidate distribution ====
x m	0	0.25	0.5	1	1.5
3	87.6	87.9	88.9	93.0	97.4
6	82.1	80.2	76.2	71.9	79.9
10	74.1	70.1	61.2	47.6	54.1
15	66.9	60.6	46.4	26.6	30.8
25	58.3	47.0	26.3	8.1	10.1
40	50.2	33.3	11.3	1.5	2.1

Some systems, and the Borda count in particular, are vulnerable when the distribution of candidates is displaced relative to the distribution of voters. The attached table shows the accuracy of the Borda count (as a percentage) when an infinite population of voters satisfies a univariate Gaussian distribution and m candidates are drawn from a similar distribution offset by x standard distributions. Red colouring indicates figures which are worse than random. Recall that all Condorcet methods give 100% accuracy for this problem. (And notice that the reduction in accuracy as x increases is not seen when there are only 3 candidates.)

Sensitivity to the distribution of candidates can be thought of as a matter either of accuracy or of resistance to manipulation. If one expects that in the course of things candidates will naturally come from the same distribution as voters, then any displacement will be seen as attempted subversion; but if one thinks that factors determining the viability of candidacy (such as financial backing) may be correlated with ideological position, then one will view it more in terms of accuracy.

Published evaluations take different views of the candidate distribution. Some simply assume that candidates are drawn from the same distribution as voters. Several older papers assume equal means but allow the candidate distribution to be more or less tight than the voter distribution. A paper by Tideman and Plassmann approximates the relationship between candidate and voter distributions based on empirical measurements. This is less realistic than it may appear, since it makes no allowance for the candidate distribution to adjust to exploit any weakness in the voting system. A paper by James Green-Armytage looks at the candidate distribution as a separate issue, viewing it as a form of manipulation and measuring the effects of strategic entry and exit. Unsurprisingly he finds the Borda count to be particularly vulnerable.

==== Evaluation for other properties ====
- As previously mentioned, Chamberlin and Cohen measured the frequency with which certain non-Condorcet systems elect Condorcet winners. Under a spatial model with equal voter and candidate distributions the frequencies are 99% (Coombs), 86% (Borda), 60% (IRV) and 33% (FPTP). This is sometimes known as Condorcet efficiency.
- Darlington measured the frequency with which Copeland's method produces a unique winner in elections with no Condorcet winner. He found it to be less than 50% for fields of up to 10 candidates.

=== Experimental metrics ===
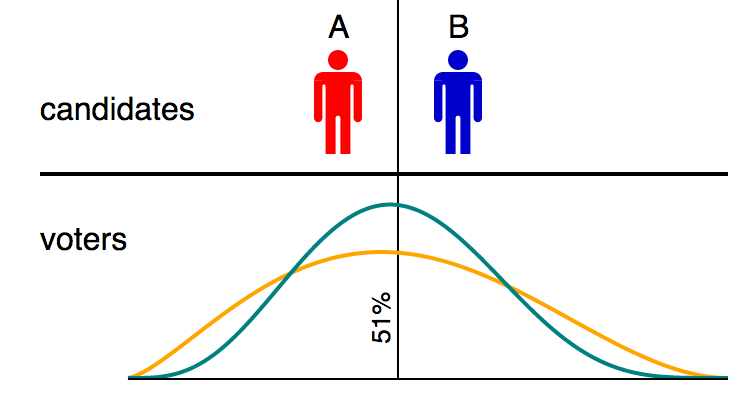
Two elections with the same candidates

The task of a voting system under a spatial model is to identify the candidate whose position most accurately represents the distribution of voter opinions. This amounts to choosing a location parameter for the distribution from the set of alternatives offered by the candidates. Location parameters may be based on the mean, the median, or the mode; but since ranked preference ballots provide only ordinal information, the median is the only acceptable statistic.

This can be seen from the diagram, which illustrates two simulated elections with the same candidates but different voter distributions. In both cases the mid-point between the candidates is the 51st percentile of the voter distribution; hence 51% of voters prefer A and 49% prefer B. If we consider a voting method to be correct if it elects the candidate closest to the median of the voter population, then since the median is necessarily slightly to the left of the 51% line, a voting method will be considered to be correct if it elects A in each case.

The mean of the teal distribution is also slightly to the left of the 51% line, but the mean of the orange distribution is slightly to the right. Hence if we consider a voting method to be correct if it elects the candidate closest to the mean of the voter population, then a method will not be able to obtain full marks unless it produces different winners from the same ballots in the two elections. Clearly this will impute spurious errors to voting methods. The same problem will arise for any cardinal measure of location; only the median gives consistent results.

The median is not defined for multivariate distributions but the univariate median has a property which generalizes conveniently. The median of a distribution is the position whose average distance from all points within the distribution is smallest. This definition generalizes to the geometric median in multiple dimensions. The distance is often defined as a voter's disutility function.

If we have a set of candidates and a population of voters, then it is not necessary to solve the computationally difficult problem of finding the geometric median of the voters and then identify the candidate closest to it; instead we can identify the candidate whose average distance from the voters is minimized. This is the metric which has been generally deployed since Merrill onwards; see also Green-Armytage and Darlington.

The candidate closest to the geometric median of the voter distribution may be termed the 'spatial winner'.

== Evaluation by real elections ==
Data from real elections can be analysed to compare the effects of different systems, by comparing between countries, or the effects of the use of different systems in the same country at different times, or by applying alternative electoral systems to the real election data. The electoral outcomes can be compared through democracy indices, measures of political fragmentation, wasted votes, voter turnout, political efficacy and various economic and judicial indicators. The practical criteria to assess real elections include the share of wasted votes, the complexity of vote counting, proportionality of the representation elected based on parties' shares of votes, and barriers to entry for new political movements. Additional opportunities for comparison of real elections arise through electoral reforms.

A Canadian example of such an opportunity is seen in the City of Edmonton (Canada), which went from first-past-the-post voting in 1917 Alberta general election to five-member plurality block voting in 1921 Alberta general election, to five-member single transferable voting in 1926 Alberta general election, then to FPTP again in 1959 Alberta general election. One party swept all the Edmonton seats in 1917, 1921 and 1959. Under STV in 1926, two Conservatives, one Liberal, one Labour and one United Farmers MLA were elected.

== Comparison of single-winner voting methods ==
=== Logical criteria for single-winner elections ===
Traditionally the merits of different electoral systems have been argued by reference to logical criteria. These have the form of rules of inference for electoral decisions, licensing the deduction, for instance, that "if E and E ' are elections such that R (E,E '), and if A is the rightful winner of E , then A is the rightful winner of E ' ".

=== Result criteria (absolute) ===
The absolute criteria state that, if the set of ballots is a certain way, a certain candidate must or must not win.

Result criteria (absolute)
Criterion	Description
Majority criterion	Will a candidate who is listed as the unique favorite by a majority of voters always win? This criterion comes in two versions: 1. Ranked majority criterion, in which an option which is merely preferred over the others by a majority must win. (Passing the ranked MC is denoted by "yes" in the table below, because it implies also passing the following:); 2. Rated majority criterion, in which only an option which is uniquely given a perfect rating by a majority must win. The ranked and rated MC are synonymous for ranked voting methods, but not for rated or graded ones. The ranked MC, but not the rated MC, is incompatible with the independence of irrelevant alternatives criterion explained below.
Majority loser criterion	if a majority of voters prefers every other candidate over a given candidate, then does that candidate not win?
Mutual majority criterion	Will the winning candidate always come from a group of candidates ranked above all others by a majority of voters?
Condorcet winner criterion	If a candidate beats every other candidate in head-to-head match-ups, will that candidate always win the election? (This implies the majority criterion, above.)
Condorcet loser criterion	If a candidate loses to every other candidate in head-to-head match-ups, will that candidate always lose the election?
Pareto criterion	1. Weak Pareto: If every voter strictly prefers candidate A to candidate B, must B never win?; 2. Strong Pareto: If every voter weakly prefers A to B, and at least one voter strictly prefers A to B, must B never win?
Smith criterion	Will the winner always belong to the Smith set, meaning the smallest nonempty set of candidates such that every candidate in the set beats every candidate outside it head-to-head?

=== Result criteria (relative) ===
These are criteria that state that, if a certain candidate wins in one circumstance, the same candidate must (or must not) win in a related circumstance.

Result criteria (relative)
Criteron	Description
Independence of Smith-dominated alternatives (Smith-IIA)	Does the outcome never change if a Smith-dominated candidate is added or removed, assuming votes regarding the other candidates are unchanged? Candidate C is Smith-dominated if there is some other candidate A such that C is beaten by A and every candidate B that is not beaten by A etc. Note that although this criterion is classed here as nominee-relative, it has a strong absolute component in excluding Smith-dominated candidates from winning. In fact, it implies all of the absolute criteria above.
Independence of Pareto-dominated alternatives (IPDA)	If a candidate is Pareto-dominated by another candidate, meaning every voter prefers the other candidate to them, can adding or removing that dominated candidate change the election outcome among the remaining candidates?
Independence of irrelevant alternatives (IIA)	Does the outcome never change if a non-winning candidate is added or removed, assuming voter preferences regarding the other candidates are unchanged? For instance, plurality rule fails IIA; adding a candidate X can cause the winner to change from W to Y even though Y receives no more votes than before.
Local independence of irrelevant alternatives (LIIA)	Does the relative order of finish of the candidates never change if the candidate that won or the candidate that finished last is deleted from all the votes?
Independence of clone alternatives (cloneproof)	Does the outcome never change if non-winning candidates similar to an existing candidate are added? There are three different situations which could cause a method to fail this criterion: Spoilers Candidates which decrease the chance of any of the similar or clone candidates winning, also known as a spoiler effect. Teams Sets of similar candidates whose mere presence helps the chances of any of them winning. Crowds Additional candidates who affect the outcome of an election without either helping or harming the chances of their factional group, but instead affecting another group.
Monotonicity criterion (monotone)	If candidate W wins for one set of ballots, will W still always win if those ballots change to increase support for W? This also implies that you cannot cause a losing candidate to win by decreasing support for them.
Consistency criterion	If candidate W wins for one set of ballots, will W still always win if those ballots change by adding another set of ballots where W also wins?
Participation criterion	Is voting honestly always better than not voting at all? (This is grouped with the distinct but similar Consistency Criterion in the table below.)
Reversal symmetry	If individual preferences of each voter are inverted, does the original winner never win?
Homogeneity criterion	If every ballot is replicated the same number of times, does the result change?

=== Ballot-counting criteria ===
These are criteria which relate to the process of counting votes and determining a winner.

Ballot-counting criteria
Criterion	Description
Polynomial time	Can the winner be calculated in a runtime that is polynomial in the number of candidates and linear in the number of voters?
Resolvable	Can the winner be calculated in all cases – except exact ties by ballot count – without using any random processes such as flipping coins? That is, are exact ties, in which the winner could be one of two or more candidates, vanishingly rare in large elections?
Summability	Can the winner be calculated by tallying ballots at each polling station separately and simply adding up the individual tallies? The amount of information necessary for such tallies is expressed as an order function of the number of candidates N. Slower-growing functions such as O(N) or O(N^{2}) make for easier counting, while faster-growing functions such as O(N!) might make it more difficult to do the same.

=== Strategy criteria ===
These are criteria that relate to a voter's incentive to use certain forms of strategy. They could also be considered as relative result criteria; however, unlike the criteria in that section, these criteria are directly relevant to voters; the fact that a method passes these criteria can simplify the process of figuring out one's optimal strategic vote.

Strategy criteria
Criterion	Description
Later-no-harm criterion	Can voters be sure that adding a lower preference to a ballot will not harm any more preferred candidate already listed?
Later-no-help criterion	Can voters be sure that adding a lower preference to a ballot will not help any more preferred candidate already listed?
No favorite betrayal criterion	Can voters be sure that they do not need to support any other candidate above their favorite in order to obtain a result they prefer?

=== Ballot format ===
Ballots are broadly distinguishable into two categories, cardinal and ordinal, where cardinal ballots request individual measures of support for each candidate and ordinal ballots request relative measures of support. A few methods do not fall neatly into one category, such as STAR, which asks the voter to give independent ratings for each candidate, but uses both the absolute and relative ratings to determine the winner. Comparing two methods based on ballot type alone is mostly a matter of voter experience preference, unless the ballot type is connected back to one of the other mathematical criterion listed here.

=== Relative strength ===
Criterion A is "stronger" than B if satisfying A implies satisfying B. For instance, the Condorcet criterion is stronger than the majority criterion, because all majority winners are Condorcet winners. Thus, any voting method that satisfies the Condorcet criterion must satisfy the majority criterion.

=== Compliance of selected single-winner methods ===
The following table shows which of the above criteria are met by several single-winner methods. Not every criterion is listed.

Comparison of single-winner voting systems
Criterion Method	Majority winner	Majority loser	Mutual majority	Condorcet winner (Note: Condorcet's criterion is incompatible with the consistency, independence of irrelevant alternatives, participation, later-no-harm, later-no-help, and sincere favorite criteria.)	Condorcet loser	Pareto	Smith	Smith-IIA	IIA/LIIA	IPDA	Cloneproof	Monotone	Consistency	Participation	Reversal symmetry	Homogeneity	Later-no-harm	Later-no-help	Sincere favorite	Ballot type
Plurality	Yes	No	No	No	No	Yes	No	No	No		No	Yes	Yes	Yes	No	Yes	Yes	Yes	No	Single mark
Anti-plurality	No	Yes	No	No	No	No	No	No	No	No	No	Yes	Yes	Yes	No	Yes	No	No	Yes	Single mark
Two round system	Yes	Yes	No	No	Yes		No	No	No		No	No	No	No		Yes	Yes	Yes	No	Single mark
Instant-runoff	Yes	Yes	Yes	No	Yes	Yes	No	No	No		Yes	No	No	No	No	Yes	Yes	Yes	No	Ranking
Coombs	Yes	Yes	Yes	No	Yes		No	No	No	No	No	No	No	No		Yes	No	No	Yes	Ranking
Nanson	Yes	Yes	Yes	Yes	Yes		Yes	No	No	No	No	No	No	No	Yes		No	No	No	Ranking
Baldwin	Yes	Yes	Yes	Yes	Yes		Yes	No	No	No	No	No	No	No	No		No	No	No	Ranking
Tideman alternative	Yes	Yes	Yes	Yes	Yes		Yes	Yes	No		Yes	No	No	No	No		No	No	No	Ranking
Minimax	Yes	No	No	Yes (Note: A variant of Minimax that counts only pairwise opposition, not opposition minus support, fails the Condorcet criterion and meets later-no-harm.)	No	Yes	No	No	No	Yes	No	Yes	No	No	No	Yes	No	No	No	Ranking
Copeland	Yes	Yes	Yes	Yes	Yes	Yes	Yes	Yes	No	No	No	Yes	No	No			No	No	No	Ranking
Black	Yes	Yes	No	Yes	Yes	Yes	No	No	No	No	No	Yes	No	No	Yes	Yes	No	No	No	Ranking
Kemeny	Yes	Yes	Yes	Yes	Yes	Yes	Yes	Yes	LIIA	No	No	Yes	No	No	Yes	Yes	No	No	No	Ranking
Ranked pairs	Yes	Yes	Yes	Yes	Yes	Yes	Yes	Yes	LIIA	No	Yes	Yes	No	No (Note: In Highest median, Ranked Pairs, and Schulze voting, there is always a regret-free, semi-honest ballot for any voter, holding all other ballots constant and assuming they know enough about how others will vote. Under such circumstances, there is always at least one way for a voter to participate without grading any less-preferred candidate above any more-preferred one.)	Yes	Yes	No	No	No	Ranking
Schulze	Yes	Yes	Yes	Yes	Yes	Yes	Yes	Yes	No	No	Yes	Yes	No	No	Yes	Yes	No	No	No	Ranking
Borda	No	Yes	No	No	Yes	Yes	No	No	No	No	No	Yes	Yes	Yes	Yes	Yes	No	Yes	No	Ranking
Bucklin	Yes	Yes	Yes	No	No		No	No	No	No	No	Yes	No	No	No	Yes	No	Yes	No	Ranking
Dodgson	Yes	No	No	Yes	No		No	No	No		No	No	No	No	No	No	No	No	No	Ranking
Approval	Yes	No	No	No	No	Yes	No	Yes	Yes (Note: Approval voting, score voting, and majority judgment satisfy IIA if it is assumed that voters rate candidates independently using their own absolute scale. For this to hold, in some elections, some voters must use less than their full voting power despite having meaningful preferences among viable candidates.)	Yes	Yes	Yes	Yes	Yes	Yes	Yes	No	Yes	Yes	Approvals
Majority Judgement	No	No (Note: Majority Judgment may elect a candidate uniquely least-preferred by over half of voters, but it never elects the candidate uniquely bottom-rated by over half of voters.)	No (Note: Majority Judgment fails the mutual majority criterion, but satisfies the criterion if the majority ranks the mutually favored set above a given absolute grade and all others below that grade.)	No	No		No	Yes	Yes		Yes	Yes	No	No		Yes	No	Yes	Yes	Scores
Score	No	No	No	No	No		No	Yes	Yes		Yes	Yes	Yes	Yes	Yes	Yes	No	Yes	Yes	Scores
STAR	No	Yes	No	No	Yes		No	No	No	No	No	Yes	No	No	No		No	No	No	Scores
Quadratic	No	No	No	No	No		No	No	No		No	Yes	Yes	Yes			N/A	N/A	No	Credits
Random ballot (Note: A randomly chosen ballot determines winner. This and closely related methods are of mathematical interest and included here to demonstrate that even unreasonable methods can pass voting method criteria.)	No	No	No	No	No	Yes	No	Yes	Yes	Yes	Yes	Yes		Yes	No	Yes	Yes	Yes	Yes	Single mark
Maximal lotteries	Yes			Yes	Yes	Yes	Yes		Yes		Yes	No	Yes	Yes						Ranking
Sortition (Note: Where a winner is randomly chosen from the candidates, sortition is included to demonstrate that even non-voting methods can pass some criteria.)	No	No	No	No	No	No	No	Yes	Yes	No	No	Yes	N/A	Yes	N/A	N/A	Yes	Yes	Yes	None
Table Notes																				

== Practical factors ==
The concerns raised above are used by social choice theorists to devise systems that are accurate and resistant to manipulation. However, there are also practical reasons why one system may be more socially acceptable than another, which fall under the fields of public choice and political science. Important practical considerations include:

- Ease of explanation. Some voting rules are difficult to explain to voters in a way they can intuitively understand, which may undermine public trust in elections. For example, while Schulze's rule performs well by many of the criteria above, it requires an involved explanation of beatpaths.
- Ease of voting. Different kinds of ballots may be easier to fill out; for example, studies find that many voters consider ranked voting to be complex and confusing when compared to rated voting or X voting under first-past-the-post voting.

Other considerations include barriers to entry to the political competition and likelihood of gridlocked government.

== Comparison of multi-winner systems ==
Multi-winner electoral systems at their best seek to produce assemblies representative in a broader sense than that of making the same decisions as would be made by single-winner votes. They can also be route to one-party sweeps of a city's seats, if a non-proportional system, such as plurality block voting or ticket voting, is used.

=== Metrics for multi-winner evaluations ===
Evaluating the performance of multi-winner voting methods requires different metrics than are used for single-winner systems. The following have been proposed.

- Condorcet committee efficiency (CCE) measures the likelihood that a group of elected winners would beat all losers in pairwise races.
- The Gallagher Index and Loosemore–Hanby index (LH) measure proportionality between seat share and party vote share. Gallagher generally uses overall voting party percentages or votes compared to seat percentages to assess proportionality so ignores presence of districts if any.
- Wasted votes measure the fraction of electorate not represented by any representative.

=== Multi-winner criteria ===
Result criteria
Criterion	Description
Solid coalition criterion	If at least V/k voters rank the same candidate c first, does c belong to every winning committee of size k?
Consensus committee criterion	If there exists a set W of k candidates such that every voter ranks one member of W first, and each member of W receives either ⌊V/k⌋ or ⌈V/k⌉ first-place votes, is the winning committee exactly W?
Unanimity criterion	1. Weak unanimity: If every voter ranks the same k candidates W at the top, in any order, is W at least one of the winning committees?; 2. Strong unanimity: If every voter ranks the same k candidates W at the top, in any order, is the unique winning committee exactly W?; 3. Fixed majority: If there exists a k-member set W such that a strict majority of voters rank every member of W above every non-member of W, is the winning committee exactly W?
Condorcet Committee	1. Fishburn Condorcet committee (CCF): Is the elected committee a subset of candidates that is preferred to all other subsets of the same size by a majority of voters?; 2. Gehrlein Condorcet committee (CCG): Is the elected committee a subset of candidates such that each of its members defeats in a pairwise contest any candidate outside it?; 3. Condorcet winning set (CWS): Is the elected committee a subset of candidates such that for each member not in the set a majority of the voters prefers some member in the set to it?

=== Criterion tables ===
The following table shows which of the above criteria are met by several multiple winner methods.

Comparison of multi-winner voting systems
Criterion Method	Proportionality for solid coalitions	Solid coalition	Monotone	Pareto	Consensus committee	Condorcet committee	Smith	Committee monotonicity	IIA	Consistency	Participation	Cloneproof	Homogeneity	No Favorite Betrayal	Semihonest	Universally Liked Candidates	Unanimity
Approval voting			Yes	Strong				Yes	Yes	Yes							
Proportional approval		No	No	Strong		No		No	Yes	Yes		Yes		No	No	No	
Sequential proportional approval	Yes		No	No				Yes	Yes	No	No	Yes		No	No	No	
Re-weighted range	Yes		Yes								No	Yes		No	No	No	
Single transferable vote	Yes	Yes (Note: Only if droop quota is not rounded or n ≥ k(k+1), where n is the number of voters and k is the number of candidates.)	No		Yes	No		No		No	No	Yes	Yes (Note: Only if surplus vote transfer is fractional and the droop quota is not rounded)	No	No	Yes	Strong
CPO-STV	Yes		No			Yes				No	No	Yes		No	No	Yes	
Schulze STV	Yes	Yes	Yes		Yes		Yes			No	No	Yes		No	No	Yes	
Phragmen								Yes		No							
k-Borda	No	No	Yes		No	No		Yes		Yes			Yes				Strong
Bloc voting	No	No	Yes	Strong	No	No		No		Yes			Yes				Fixed Majority
Quota Borda system	Yes	Yes						No									
Expanding approvals rule	Yes	Yes															
Multiwinner minimax			Yes	Weak	No			Yes		No			Yes				Weak
Minimax minimal size of external opposition			No	Strong	No			No		No			Yes				Fixed majority
Single non-transferable vote	No	Yes	Yes		Yes	No		Yes		Yes	Yes	No	Yes	No	Yes	N/A (not proportional)	Weak
Limited vote	No		Yes					Yes		Yes	Yes	No	Yes	No	Yes	N/A (not proportional)	
Cumulative voting	No		Yes							Yes	Yes			No	Yes	N/A (not proportional)	
Sortition, arbitrary winner	No		Yes			No				Yes	Yes	Yes		Yes	Yes	N/A (not proportional)	
Multiple random ballots	No (Note: Approaches proportional representation as the committee size increases)	No	Yes	No		No		Yes		Yes	Yes	Yes		Yes	Yes	N/A (not proportional)	

== See also ==
- Arrow's impossibility theorem – Proof all ranked voting rules have spoilers
- Cardinal utility and ordinal utility
- Condorcet paradox – Self-contradiction of majority rule
