= Black's method =

Single-winner electoral system

Black's method is an election method proposed by Duncan Black in 1958 as a compromise between the Condorcet method and the Borda count. This method selects a Condorcet winner. If a Condorcet winner does not exist, then the candidate with the highest Borda score is selected.

== Properties ==
Among methods satisfying the majority criterion, Black's method gives the minimum power to the majority and hence the method is best at protecting minorities.

=== Satisfied criteria ===
Black's method satisfies the following criteria:

- Unrestricted domain
- Non-imposition (a.k.a. citizen sovereignty)
- Non-dictatorship
- Homogeneity
- Condorcet criterion
- Majority criterion
- Pareto criterion (a.k.a. unanimity)
- Monotonicity criterion
- Majority loser criterion
- Condorcet loser criterion
- Reversal symmetry
- Resolvability criterion
- Polynomial time

=== Failed criteria ===
Black's method does not satisfy the following criteria:

- Mutual majority criterion
- Smith criterion
- Participation
- Consistency
- Independence of Smith-dominated alternatives
- Independence of clones
- Independence of irrelevant alternatives
- Local independence of irrelevant alternatives
- Sincere favorite criterion
