= STAR voting =

Single-winner electoral system

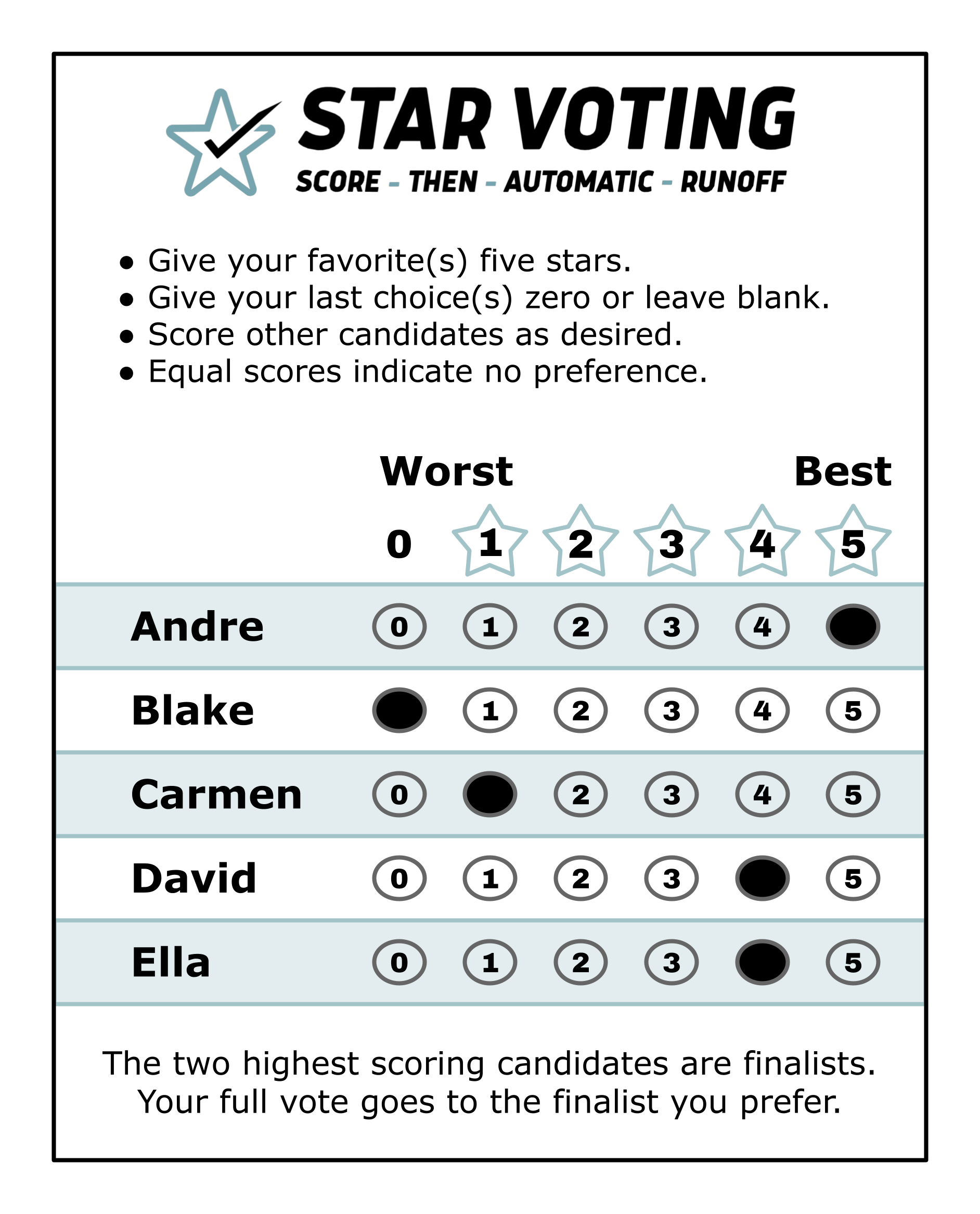
The STAR voting ballot, including recommended instructions and formatting details

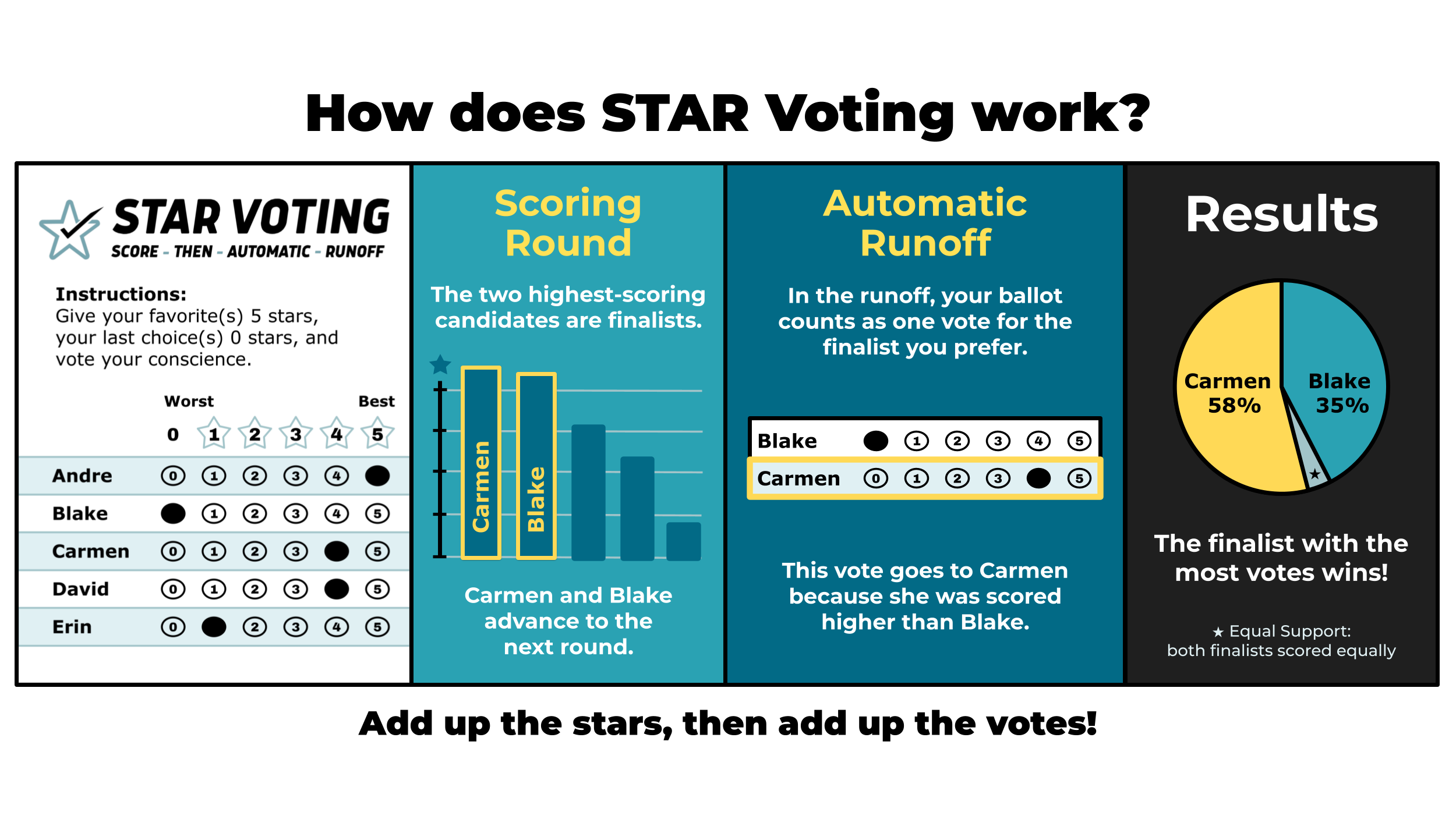
Graphic explaining how STAR Voting works

STAR voting is an electoral system for single-seat elections. The name (an allusion to star ratings) stands for "Score Then Automatic Runoff", referring to the fact that this system is a combination of score voting, to pick two finalists with the highest total scores, followed by an "automatic runoff" in which the finalist who is preferred on more ballots wins. It is a type of cardinal voting electoral system.

== Method ==
In STAR, voters are given a score ballot (or ratings ballot) on which each voter scores candidates with a number from 0 up to 5, with 0 representing "worst" and 5 representing "best". The scores for each candidate are then summed, and the two highest-scored candidates are selected as finalists. In the automatic runoff round, the finalist who was given a higher score on a greater number of ballots is selected as the winner.

== Usage ==
The concept was first proposed in October 2014 by Mark Frohnmayer, and was initially called score runoff voting (SRV). The runoff step was introduced in an attempt to reduce strategic incentives in ordinary score voting, such as bullet voting and tactical maximization. STAR is intended to be a hybrid between (rated) score voting and (ranked) instant runoff voting.

The first movement to implement STAR voting was centered in Oregon, with chapters in Eugene, Portland, Salem, Astoria, and Ashland. In July 2018, supporters submitted over 16,000 signatures for a ballot initiative in Lane County, Oregon, putting Measure 20-290 on the November 2018 ballot. This ballot measure did not pass, with 47.6% of voters voting yes, and 52.4% of voters voting no.

In 2019, the Multnomah County Democratic Party adopted STAR for all internal elections. A 2020 ballot initiative for the city of Eugene (in which a 54% majority had supported the 2018 county initiative) was attempted, as well as a second attempt at Lane County, and an initiative in Troutdale, Oregon. On July 27, 2020, after the Eugene City Council deadlocked at 4-4 on a vote to refer a measure allowing STAR voting to be used in city elections to the November 2020 ballot, Eugene Mayor Lucy Vinis cast the deciding vote against the referral, meaning that no Eugene ballot measure would be held in 2020.

The Independent Party of Oregon used STAR voting in their 2020 primary election. The Democratic Party of Oregon used STAR Voting for their elections for delegates to the 2020 Democratic convention. In 2022, the Libertarian Party of Oregon authorized STAR voting for its internal elections starting in 2023. In 2024, the city council of Oakridge, Oregon, voted 5-1 to place a STAR voting measure on the November ballot. The measure would have implemented STAR voting for the following three elections before holding a vote on whether to permanently adopt it. However, the measure failed with 46% approval.

== Example ==
Tennessee voting pattern

42% of voters	26% of voters	15% of voters	17% of voters
1. Memphis; 2. Nashville; 3. Chattanooga; 4. Knoxville	1. Nashville; 2. Chattanooga; 3. Knoxville; 4. Memphis	1. Chattanooga; 2. Knoxville; 3. Nashville; 4. Memphis	1. Knoxville; 2. Chattanooga; 3. Nashville; 4. Memphis

Suppose Tennessee is holding an election on the location of its capital. The population is split between four cities, and all the voters want the capital to be as close to them as possible. The options are:

- Memphis, large but far to the west
- Nashville, medium, near the center
- Chattanooga, small and in the east
- Knoxville, small and isolated

Suppose that 100 voters each decided to score from 0 to 5 stars each city such that their most liked choice got 5 stars, and least liked choice got 0 stars, with the intermediate choices getting an amount proportional to their relative distance.

Voter from/ City choice	Memphis	Nashville	Chattanooga	Knoxville	Total
Memphis	210 (42 × 5)	0 (26 × 0)	0 (15 × 0)	0 (17 × 0)	210
Nashville	84 (42 × 2)	130 (26 × 5)	45 (15 × 3)	34 (17 × 2)	293
Chattanooga	42 (42 × 1)	52 (26 × 2)	75 (15 × 5)	68 (17 × 4)	237
Knoxville	0 (42 × 0)	26 (26 × 1)	45 (15 × 3)	85 (17 × 5)	156

The top-two frontrunners are Nashville and Chattanooga. Of the two, Nashville is preferred by 68% (42+26) to 32% (15+17) of voters, so Nashville, the capital in real life, likewise wins in the example.

For comparison:

- Traditional first-past-the-post would elect Memphis, even though most citizens consider it the worst choice, because 42% is larger than any other single city.
- Instant-runoff voting would elect the second-worst choice (Knoxville) because the central candidates would be eliminated early.
- Under score voting, Nashville would have won, since it had the highest score in the first round.
- In approval voting, with each voter selecting their top two cities, Nashville would also win because of the significant boost from Memphis residents.
- A two-round system would have a runoff between Memphis and Nashville, where Nashville would win.

In this particular case, there is no way for any single city of voters to get a better outcome through tactical voting; however, Chattanooga and Knoxville voters combined could vote strategically to make Chattanooga win; while Memphis and Nashville voters could defend against that strategy and ensure Nashville still won by strategically giving Nashville a higher rating and/or Chattanooga and Knoxville lower ratings.

== Ties ==
Because STAR voting is counted in two rounds, a tie can arise at either stage: in the scoring round, when candidates are tied for one of the two finalist positions and it must be decided which advances to the runoff; and in the automatic runoff, when the two finalists are preferred by an equal number of voters. As with any voting method, ties are more likely in elections with few voters.

Under the rules published by the Equal Vote Coalition, ties are first resolved by referring back to the ballots. A tie in the scoring round is broken in favor of the candidate who is preferred by more voters in a head-to-head comparison; a tie in the runoff is broken in favor of the candidate with the higher total score. Any tie that remains after these steps is considered a true tie and is resolved by a random method such as drawing lots, as is common practice for tied elections.

== Properties ==
STAR voting satisfies the monotonicity criterion, i.e. raising one's vote's score for a candidate can never hurt their chances of winning, and lowering it can never help their chances. It also satisfies the resolvability criterion (in both Tideman and Woodall's versions).

There are a number of other voting system criteria it does not satisfy. These include the majority criterion, as it can happen that a candidate does not make it to the runoff, even if they are the first preference of a majority. It does not satisfy the mutual majority criterion. It does not always satisfy reversal symmetry. It also violates participation, consistency, and independence of clones (where any clones of the highest rated candidate may receive almost the same rating and enter the runoff, ahead of the second most popular non-clone). It does not satisfy the later-no-harm criterion, meaning that giving a positive rating to a less-preferred candidate can cause a more-preferred candidate to lose. Proponents argue that every voting system is flawed and that the strengths of STAR voting outweigh its weaknesses.

== See also ==
- List of democracy and elections-related topics
- Consensus decision-making
- Decision making
- Democracy
- Relative utilitarianism
- Highest median voting rules—similar voting method, based on medians instead of averages and verbal appreciations instead of notes
- Unified primary—alternate voting method for nonpartisan blanket primary that uses approval voting-based method in primary election
