= Majoritarian criteria =

In voting theory, the term majority criterion can refer to:

- Condorcet's majority-rule principle
- majority-favorite criterion
- Woodall's mutual majority criterion
- The majority-loser criterion and majoritarian failure
- Condorcet loser criterion
