= Homogeneity criterion =

Homogeneity is a common property for voting systems. The property is satisfied if, in any election, the result depends only on the proportion of ballots of each possible type. That is, if every ballot is replicated the same number of times, then the result should not change.

== Complying methods ==
Any voting method that counts voter preferences proportionally satisfies homogeneity, including voting methods such as Plurality voting, Two-round system, Single transferable vote, Instant Runoff Voting, Contingent vote, Coombs' method, Approval voting, Anti-plurality voting, Borda count, Range voting, Bucklin voting, Majority Judgment, Condorcet methods and others.

== Noncomplying methods ==
A voting method that determines a winner by eliminating candidates not having a fixed number of votes, rather than a proportional or a percentage of votes, may not satisfy the homogeneity criterion.

Dodgson's method does not satisfy homogeneity.

== Example of Proportional Preference Profiles ==
The following four voter preference profiles show rankings of candidates by voters that are proportional.

Profile 1

# of voters	Preferences
6	A > B > C
3	B > A > C
3	C > B > A

Profile 2

Ratio of voters	Preferences
.5	A > B > C
.25	B > A > C
.25	C > B > A

Profile 3

Percent of voters	Preferences
50%	A > B > C
25%	B > A > C
25%	C > B > A

Profile 4

Fraction of voters	Preferences
$\tfrac{1}{2}$	A > B > C
$\tfrac{1}{4}$	B > A > C
$\tfrac{1}{4}$	C > B > A

A voting method satisfying homogeneity will return the same election results for each of the four preference profiles.
