= Later-no-harm criterion =

Property of electoral systems

Voting system
Name	Comply?
Plurality	Yes (Note: Plurality voting can be thought of as a ranked voting system that disregards preferences after the first; because all preferences other than the first are unimportant, plurality passes later-no-harm as traditionally defined.)
Two-round system	Yes
Partisan primary	Yes
Instant-runoff voting	Yes
Minimax Opposition	Yes
DSC	Yes
Anti-plurality	No
Approval	N/A
Borda	No
Dodgson	No
Copeland	No
Kemeny	No
Ranked Pairs	No
Schulze	No
Score	No
Majority judgment	No

Later-no-harm is a property of voting systems first described by Douglas Woodall. In later-no-harm systems, increasing the rating or rank of a candidate ranked below the winner of an election cannot cause a higher-ranked candidate to lose. It is a common property in the plurality-rule family of voting systems.

For example, say a group of voters ranks Alice 2nd and Bob 6th, and Alice wins the election. In the next election, Bob focuses on expanding his appeal with this group of voters, but does not manage to defeat Alice—Bob's rating increases from 6th-place to 3rd. Later-no-harm says that this increased support from Alice's voters should not allow Bob to win.

Later-no-harm may be confused as implying center squeeze, since later-no-harm is a defining characteristic of first-preference plurality (FPP) and instant-runoff voting (IRV), and descending solid coalitions (DSC), systems that have similar mechanics that are based on first preference counting. These systems pass later-no-harm compliance by making sure the results either do not depend on lower preferences at all (plurality) or only depend on them if all higher preferences have been eliminated (IRV and DSC), and thus exhibit a center squeeze effect. However, this does not mean that methods that pass later-no-harm must be vulnerable to center squeezes. The properties are distinct, as Minimax opposition also passes later-no-harm.

Later-no-harm is also often confused with immunity to a kind of strategic voting called strategic truncation or bullet voting. Satisfying later-no-harm does not provide immunity to such strategies. Systems like instant runoff that pass later-no-harm but fail monotonicity still incentivize truncation or bullet voting in some situations.

== Later-no-harm methods ==
The plurality vote, two-round system, instant-runoff voting, and descending solid coalitions satisfy the later-no-harm criterion. First-preference plurality satisfies later-no-harm trivially, by ignoring every preference after the first.

=== Non-LNH methods ===
Nearly all voting methods not discussed above fail LNH, including score voting, highest medians, Borda count, and all Condorcet methods. The Condorcet criterion is incompatible with later-no-harm (assuming the resolvability criterion, i.e. any tie can be removed by a single voter changing their rating).

Bloc voting, which allows a voter to select multiple candidates, does not satisfy later-no-harm when used to fill two or more seats in a single district, although the single non-transferable vote does.

== Examples ==
=== Anti-plurality ===
Anti-plurality elects the candidate the fewest voters rank last when submitting a complete ranking of the candidates.

Later-No-Harm can be considered not applicable to Anti-Plurality if the method is assumed to not accept truncated preference listings from the voter. On the other hand, Later-No-Harm can be applied to Anti-Plurality if the method is assumed to apportion the last place vote among unlisted candidates equally, as shown in the example below.

Examples

Truncated Ballot Profile

Assume four voters (marked bold) submit a truncated preference listing A > B = C by apportioning the possible orderings for B and C equally. Each vote is counted $\tfrac{1}{2}$ A > B > C, and $\tfrac{1}{2}$ A > C > B:

# of voters	Preferences
2	A ( > B > C)
2	A ( > C > B)
1	B > A > C
1	B > C > A
1	C > A > B
1	C > B > A

Result: A is listed last on 2 ballots; B is listed last on 3 ballots; C is listed last on 3 ballots. A is listed last on the least ballots. A wins.

Adding Later Preferences

Now assume that the four voters supporting A (marked bold) add later preference C, as follows:

# of voters	Preferences
4	A > C > B
1	B > A > C
1	B > C > A
1	C > A > B
1	C > B > A

Result: A is listed last on 2 ballots; B is listed last on 5 ballots; C is listed last on 1 ballot. C is listed last on the least ballots. C wins. A loses.

Conclusion

The four voters supporting A decrease the probability of A winning by adding later preference C to their ballot, changing A from the winner to a loser. Thus, Anti-plurality doesn't satisfy the Later-no-harm criterion when truncated ballots are considered to apportion the last place vote amongst unlisted candidates equally.

=== Borda count ===
Examples

This example shows that the Borda count violates the Later-no-harm criterion. Assume three candidates A, B and C and 5 voters with the following preferences:

# of voters	Preferences
3	A > B > C
2	B > C > A

Express later preferences

Assume that all preferences are expressed on the ballots.

The positions of the candidates and computation of the Borda points can be tabulated as follows:

candidate	#1.	#2.	#last	computation	Borda points
A	3	0	2	3*2 + 0*1	6
B	2	3	0	2*2 + 3*1	7
C	0	2	3	0*2 + 2*1	2

Result: B wins with 7 Borda points.

Hide later preferences

Assume now that the three voters supporting A (marked bold) would not express their later preferences on the ballots:

# of voters	Preferences
3	A
2	B > C > A

The positions of the candidates and computation of the Borda points can be tabulated as follows:

candidate	#1.	#2.	#last	computation	Borda points
A	3	0	2	3*2 + 0*1	6
B	2	0	3	2*2 + 0*1	4
C	0	2	3	0*2 + 2*1	2

Result: A wins with 6 Borda points.

Conclusion

By hiding their later preferences about B, the three voters could change their first preference A from loser to winner. Thus, the Borda count doesn't satisfy the Later-no-harm criterion.

=== Copeland ===
Examples

This example shows that Copeland's method violates the Later-no-harm criterion. Assume four candidates A, B, C and D with 4 potential voters and the following preferences:

# of voters	Preferences
2	A > B > C > D
1	B > C > A > D
1	D > C > B > A

Express later preferences

Assume that all preferences are expressed on the ballots.

The results would be tabulated as follows:

Pairwise election results
		X			
		A	B	C	D
Y	A		[X] 2 [Y] 2	[X] 2 [Y] 2	[X] 1 [Y] 3
Y	B	[X] 2 [Y] 2		[X] 1 [Y] 3	[X] 1 [Y] 3
Y	C	[X] 2 [Y] 2	[X] 3 [Y] 1		[X] 1 [Y] 3
Y	D	[X] 3 [Y] 1	[X] 3 [Y] 1	[X] 3 [Y] 1	
Pairwise election results (won-tied-lost):		1-2-0	2-1-0	1-1-1	0-0-3

Result: B has two wins and no defeat, A has only one win and no defeat. Thus, B is elected Copeland winner.

Hide later preferences

Assume now, that the two voters supporting A (marked bold) would not express their later preferences on the ballots:

# of voters	Preferences
2	A
1	B > C > A > D
1	D > C > B > A

The results would be tabulated as follows:

Pairwise election results
		X			
		A	B	C	D
Y	A		[X] 2 [Y] 2	[X] 2 [Y] 2	[X] 1 [Y] 3
Y	B	[X] 2 [Y] 2		[X] 1 [Y] 1	[X] 1 [Y] 1
Y	C	[X] 2 [Y] 2	[X] 1 [Y] 1		[X] 1 [Y] 1
Y	D	[X] 3 [Y] 1	[X] 1 [Y] 1	[X] 1 [Y] 1	
Pairwise election results (won-tied-lost):		1-2-0	0-3-0	0-3-0	0-2-1

Result: A has one win and no defeat, B has no win and no defeat. Thus, A is elected Copeland winner.

Conclusion

By hiding their later preferences, the two voters could change their first preference A from loser to winner. Thus, Copeland's method doesn't satisfy the Later-no-harm criterion.

=== Schulze method ===
Examples

This example shows that the Schulze method doesn't satisfy the Later-no-harm criterion. Assume three candidates A, B and C and 16 voters with the following preferences:

# of voters	Preferences
3	A > B > C
1	A = B > C
2	A = C > B
3	B > A > C
1	B > A = C
1	B > C > A
4	C > A = B
1	C > B > A

Express later preferences

Assume that all preferences are expressed on the ballots.

The pairwise preferences would be tabulated as follows:

Matrix of pairwise preferences
	d[*,A]	d[*,B]	d[*,C]
d[A,*]		5	7
d[B,*]	6		9
d[C,*]	6	7	

Result: B is Condorcet winner and thus, the Schulze method will elect B.

==== Hide later preferences ====
Assume now that the three voters supporting A (marked bold) would not express their later preferences on the ballots:

# of voters	Preferences
3	A
1	A = B > C
2	A = C > B
3	B > A > C
1	B > A = C
1	B > C > A
4	C > A = B
1	C > B > A

The pairwise preferences would be tabulated as follows:

Matrix of pairwise preferences
	d[*,A]	d[*,B]	d[*,C]
d[A,*]		5	7
d[B,*]	6		6
d[C,*]	6	7	

Now, the strongest paths have to be identified, e.g. the path A > C > B is stronger than the direct path A > B (which is nullified, since it is a loss for A).

Strengths of the strongest paths
	p[*,A]	p[*,B]	p[*,C]
p[A,*]		7	7
p[B,*]	6		6
p[C,*]	6	7	

Result: The full ranking is A > C > B. Thus, A is elected Schulze winner.

Conclusion

By hiding their later preferences about B and C, the three voters could change their first preference A from loser to winner. Thus, the Schulze method doesn't satisfy the Later-no-harm criterion.

== Criticism ==
Douglas Woodall writes:

[U]nder STV the later preferences on a ballot are not even considered until the fates of all candidates of earlier preference have been decided. Thus a voter can be certain that adding extra preferences to his or her preference listing can neither help nor harm any candidate already listed. Supporters of STV usually regard this as a very important property, although it has to be said that not everyone agrees; the property has been described (by Michael Dummett, in a letter to Robert Newland) as "quite unreasonable", and (by an anonymous referee) as "unpalatable".

== See also ==
- Later-no-help criterion
- Monotonicity criterion

== Bibliography ==
- D R Woodall, "Properties of Preferential Election Rules", Voting matters, Issue 3, December 1994
- Tony Anderson Solgard and Paul Landskroener, Bench and Bar of Minnesota, Vol 59, No 9, October 2002.
- John Brown, Jr. v. W. H. Smallwood, 130 Minn. 492, 153 N.W. 953 (July 30, 1915)
