= Sincere favorite criterion =

Criterion that prevents lesser-evil voting

The sincere favorite or no favorite-betrayal criterion is a property of some voting systems that says voters should have no incentive to vote for someone else over their favorite. It protects voters from having to engage in lesser-evil voting or a strategy called "decapitation" (removing the "head" off a ballot).

Most rated voting systems satisfy the criterion while most ranked voting systems fail this criterion. Lesser-evil-voting is particularly prevalent in plurality-based voting systems like ranked choice voting (RCV), traditional runoffs, partisan primaries, and first-past-the-post. Lesser-evil voting is typically associated with center-squeeze in these systems.

Duverger's law says that systems vulnerable to this strategy will typically (though not always) develop two party-systems, as voters will abandon minor-party candidates to support stronger major-party candidates.

== Definition ==
A voting rule satisfies the sincere favorite criterion if there is never a need to "betray" a perfect candidate—i.e. if a voter will never achieve a worse result by honestly ranking their favorite candidate first.

== Arguments for ==
The Center for Election Science argues systems that violate the favorite betrayal criterion strongly incentivize voters to cast dishonest ballots, which can make voters feel unsatisfied or frustrated with the results despite having the opportunity to participate in the election.

Other commentators have argued that failing the favorite-betrayal criterion can increase the effectiveness of misinformation campaigns, by allowing major-party candidates to sow doubt as to whether voting honestly for one's favorite is actually the best strategy.

== Compliant methods ==
=== Rated voting ===
Because rated voting methods are not affected by Arrow's theorem, they can be both spoilerproof (satisfy IIA) and ensure positive vote weights at the same time. Taken together, these properties imply that increasing the rating of a favorite candidate can never change the result, except by causing the favorite candidate to win; therefore, giving a favorite candidate the maximum level of support is always the optimal strategy.

Examples of systems that are both spoilerproof and monotonic include score voting, approval voting, and highest medians.

=== Anti-plurality voting ===
Interpreted as a ranked voting method where every candidate but the last ranked gets one point, anti-plurality voting passes the sincere favorite criterion. Because there is no incentive to rank one's favorite last, and the method otherwise does not care where the favorite is ranked, the method passes.

Anti-plurality voting thus shows that the sincere favorite criterion is distinct from independence of irrelevant alternatives, and that ranked voting methods do not necessarily fail the criterion.

== Non-compliant methods ==
=== Instant-runoff voting ===
This example shows that instant-runoff voting violates the favorite betrayal criterion. Assume there are four candidates: Amy, Bert, Cindy, and Dan. This election has 41 voters with the following preferences:

# of voters	Preferences
10	Amy > Bert > Cindy > Dan
6	Bert > Amy > Cindy > Dan
5	Cindy > Bert > Amy > Dan
20	Dan > Amy > Cindy > Bert

==== Sincere voting ====
Assuming all voters vote in a sincere way, Cindy is awarded only 5 first place votes and is eliminated first. Her votes are transferred to Bert. In the second round, Amy is eliminated with only 10 votes. Her votes are transferred to Bert as well. Finally, Bert has 21 votes and wins against Dan, who has 20 votes.

Votes in round/ Candidate	1st	2nd	3rd
Amy	10	10	–
Bert	6	11	21
Cindy	5	–	–
Dan	20	20	20

Result: Bert wins against Dan, after Cindy and Amy were eliminated.

==== Favorite betrayal ====
Now assume two of the voters who favor Amy (marked bold) realize the situation and insincerely vote for Cindy instead of Amy:

# of voters	Ballots
2	Cindy > Amy > Bert > Dan
8	Amy > Bert > Cindy > Dan
6	Bert > Amy > Cindy > Dan
5	Cindy > Bert > Amy > Dan
20	Dan > Amy > Cindy > Bert

In this scenario, Cindy has 7 first place votes and so Bert is eliminated first with only 6 first place votes. His votes are transferred to Amy. In the second round, Cindy is eliminated with only 7 votes. Her votes are transferred to Amy as well. Finally, Amy has 21 votes and wins against Dan, who has 20 votes.

Votes in round/ Candidate	1st	2nd	3rd
Amy	8	14	21
Bert	6	–	–
Cindy	7	7	–
Dan	20	20	20

Result: Amy wins against Dan, after Bert and Cindy has been eliminated.

By listing Cindy ahead of their true favorite, Amy, the two insincere voters obtained a more preferred outcome (causing their favorite candidate to win). There was no way to achieve this without raising another candidate ahead of their sincere favorite. Thus, instant-runoff voting fails the favorite betrayal criterion.

== See also ==
- Comparison of electoral systems
- Electoral systems
- Vote splitting
- Independence of irrelevant alternatives
- Strategic voting
