= Edward J. Nanson =

Australian mathematician

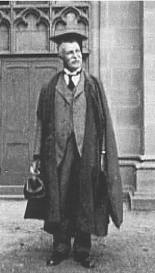
Edward J. Nanson standing

Edward John Nanson (13 December 1850 – 1 July 1936) was a mathematician. He is known in part for his contributions to social choice, including Borda-elimination, a Condorcet-compliant variant on the Borda count that uses repeated elimination to find a winner.

He was born in England and received his professional education at Trinity College from 1870 to 1874. In 1875, he was appointed Professor of Mathematics at the University of Melbourne, in the state of Victoria, Australia where he immigrated. Nanson was an election reformer and office bearer of the Proportional Representation League of Victoria who produced several booklets on election methods. He retired from his lifetime appointment in 1922. At the time of his death, he was survived by ten children from two marriages. The Professor Nanson Prize, named in his honor, is awarded annually to students for outstanding achievements in mathematics.

== Footnotes ==
1. "Methods of Election" Transactions and Proceedings of the Royal Society of Victoria, vol. 18; 1882; pages 197–240; #954.
