= Solid coalition =

Political faction in social choice

In social choice theory, a solid coalition or voting bloc is a group of voters who support a given group of candidates over any opponent outside the group. Solid coalitions formalize the idea of a political faction or voting bloc, allowing social choice theorists to study how electoral systems behave when there are ideological divisions, without having to make explicit reference to political parties. The term is useful even in the absence of party labels, or when labels do not accurately reflect ideological divisions in the electorate (as in the cleavages between Northern and Southern Democrats in the 20th century).

Historically solid coalitions were known as unanimous constituencies. Proportional representation is the representation of every group of agreeing voters in proportion to their voting strength and by the persons they really want.

== Definition ==
A solid coalition is a group of voters N together with some set of candidates C such, that each voter v in N shows by their vote that they prefer the candidates in C to all candidates outside of C.

=== Example ===
Consider the following example, taken from American politics of the 1800s. A single winner is being elected and two Whig candidates Clay and Webster are in the running.

Share:	25%	30%	20%	25%
Clay	2	1	4	3
Webster	1	2	3	4
van Buren	3	3	1	2
Jackson	4	4	2	1

In this election, the Whig faction creates a solid coalition with 55% of the vote, because 55% of voters rank both Clay and Webster over both van Buren and Jackson. Similarly, the remaining 45% of voters form a Democratic coalition.

Note that solid coalitions can be nested within each other. For example, Jackson has support from a solid coalition of 25% of voters (the voters ranking him first) and his and Van Buren's supporters together form another solid coalition.

However, there cannot be overlapping, non-nested, solid coalitions. This fact explains why the single transferable vote may be seen as disproportional if the original placement of votes in the first round of counting is taken as base of measure of proportionality when voters are not cleanly divided into clear political parties but instead contain cross-cutting cleavages (as can happen if racial and ethnic groups do not vote for candidates of one party). If proportionality is measured based on the final placement of votes, then STV's proportionality is clear.

== Applications ==
=== Proportional representation ===
One important use of solid coalitions is in defining proportional representation systems that do not rely on party labels. A voting system is proportional for solid coalitions (PSC) if it always elects a number of candidates from each solid coalition that is proportional to its size. For instance, if there are 100 voters and 10 seats, and a solid coalition of 20 voters supports candidates A, B, and C, then a PSC voting system should elect at least 2 candidates from {A, B, C}.

=== Cooperative game theory ===
Solid coalitions can be used to model coalition formation in cooperative game theory, where individuals can communicate and behave strategically in their group's interests.
