= Duncan Black =

Scottish economist (1908–1991)

- Born: 23 May 1908; Motherwell, Scotland
- Died: 14 January 1991 (aged 82); Paignton, England

Academic background
- Education: University of Glasgow
- Influences: Charles Lutwidge Dodgson; Ronald Coase; Anthony Downs

Academic work
- Discipline: Social economics
- School or tradition: Public Choice school

Duncan Black, FBA (23 May 1908 – 14 January 1991) was a Scottish economist who laid the foundations of social choice theory and public choice. In particular he was responsible for unearthing the work of many early political scientists, including Charles Lutwidge Dodgson, and was responsible for the Black electoral system, a Condorcet method whereby, in the absence of a Condorcet winner (e.g. due to a cycle), the Borda winner is chosen.

== Biography ==
Black was born in Motherwell, Scotland, an industrial town south east of Glasgow, to a working-class family. He graduated from the Dalziel High School in Motherwell and then studied mathematics and physics at the University of Glasgow. He then enrolled for a degree in economics and politics which he finished with first class honours in 1932. He started teaching at the newly formed Dundee School of Economics (later part of the University of Dundee). There Black was influenced by his colleague Ronald Coase. He later taught at the University College of North Wales (now Bangor University) and Glasgow.

Black also had visiting positions in the United States, at the universities of Rochester, Chicago, Virginia and Michigan State. These occurred after William H. Riker reviewed his work in 1961. He was elected a Foreign Honorary Member of the American Academy of Arts and Sciences in 1980.

== Archives ==
The archives for Duncan Black are maintained by the Archives of the University of Glasgow (GUAS).

== See also ==
- Median voter theorem
- Public choice theory
