= Anti-plurality voting =

Single-winner positional electoral system

Anti-plurality voting describes an electoral system in which each voter votes against a single candidate, and the candidate with the fewest votes against wins. Anti-plurality voting is an example of a positional voting method.

== Example ==

Suppose that Tennessee is holding an election on the location of its capital. The population is concentrated around four major cities. All voters want the capital to be as close to them as possible. The options are:

- Memphis, the largest city, but far from the others (42% of voters)
- Nashville, near the center of the state (26% of voters)
- Chattanooga, somewhat east (15% of voters)
- Knoxville, far to the northeast (17% of voters)

The preferences of each region's voters are:

42% of voters Far-West	26% of voters Center	15% of voters Center-East	17% of voters Far-East
1. Memphis; 2. Nashville; 3. Chattanooga; 4. Knoxville	1. Nashville; 2. Chattanooga; 3. Knoxville; 4. Memphis	1. Chattanooga; 2. Knoxville; 3. Nashville; 4. Memphis	1. Knoxville; 2. Chattanooga; 3. Nashville; 4. Memphis

In this electoral system, each voter marks a vote against his or her fourth preference. In this case, it would be a tie between Nashville and Chattanooga, both receiving zero votes. If the tie is to be resolved with anti-plurality voting as well, Nashville would win, as it has less second-to-last place votes (32%) than Chattanooga (42%). Ties could also be resolved through a second subsequent runoff election.

== Characteristics ==
As can be seen from the example, in the absence of tactical voting, this system tends to favor middle-of-the-road candidates. However, it is very sensitive to tactical voting, as any candidate perceived beforehand as a potential winner will attract more countervotes from partisans of their opponents. This creates the paradoxical situation for the candidates that, in order to win, you need to appear not to be winning. For this reason, few would advocate this system for general high-stakes use, though for its simplicity it can be useful in specific situations (where voters are not motivated to use tactical voting).

== Voting method criteria evaluation ==
APV satisfies the monotonicity criterion, the participation criterion and the consistency criterion. It does not satisfy the Condorcet loser criterion, the independence of irrelevant alternatives criterion, the independence of clones criterion or reversal symmetry.

== See also ==
- Plurality voting
- Approval voting
- Disapproval voting
- Coombs' method uses antiplurality counts with sequential elimination
