= Majority winner criterion =

Property of electoral systems

The majority criterion is a voting system criterion applicable to voting rules over ordinal preferences required that if only one candidate is ranked first by over 50% of voters, that candidate must win.

Some methods that comply with this criterion include any Condorcet method, instant-runoff voting, Bucklin voting, plurality voting, and approval voting.

The mutual majority criterion is a generalized form of the criterion meant to account for when the majority prefers multiple candidates above all others; voting methods which pass majority but fail mutual majority can encourage all but one of the majority's preferred candidates to drop out in order to ensure one of the majority-preferred candidates wins, creating a spoiler effect.

== Difference from the Condorcet criterion ==
By the majority criterion, a candidate C should win if a majority of voters answers affirmatively to the question "Do you (strictly) prefer C to every other candidate?"

The Condorcet criterion gives a stronger and more intuitive notion of majoritarianism (and as such is sometimes referred to as majority rule). According to it, a candidate C should win if for every other candidate Y there is a majority of voters that answers affirmatively to the question "Do you prefer C to Y?" A Condorcet system necessarily satisfies the majority criterion, but not vice versa.

A Condorcet winner C only has to defeat every other candidate "one-on-one"—in other words, when comparing C to any specific alternative. To be the majority choice of the electorate, a candidate C must be able to defeat every other candidate simultaneously—i.e. voters who are asked to choose between C and "anyone else" must pick "C" instead of any other candidate.

Equivalently, a Condorcet winner can have several different majority coalitions supporting them in each one-on-one matchup. A majority winner must instead have a single (consistent) majority that supports them across all one-on-one matchups.

== Application to cardinal voting methods ==
In systems with absolute rating categories such as score and highest median methods, it is not clear how the majority criterion should be defined. There are three notable definitions of for a candidate A:

1. If a majority of voters have (only) A receiving a higher score than any other candidate (even if this is not the highest possible score), this candidate will be elected.
2. If (only) A receives a perfect score from more than half of all voters, this candidate will be elected.
3. If a majority of voters prefer (only) A to any other candidate, they can choose to elect candidate A by strategizing.

The first criterion is not satisfied by any common cardinal voting method. Ordinal ballots can only tell us whether A is preferred to B (not by how much A is preferred to B), and so if we only know most voters prefer A to B, it is reasonable to say the majority should win. However, with cardinal voting systems, there is more information available, as voters also state the strength of their preferences. Thus in cardinal voting systems a sufficiently-motivated minority can sometimes outweigh the voices of a majority, if they would be strongly harmed by a policy or candidate.

== Examples ==
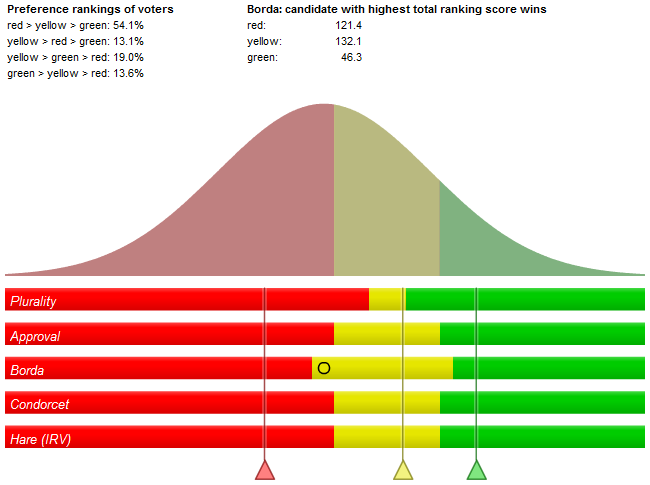
Systems that meet the majority criterion (plurality, Condorcet, and IRV) elect the Red candidate when they receive a majority of the vote. Borda count does not meet the majority criterion and does not select Red.

=== Approval voting ===
Approval voting non trivially satisfies the ranked majority criterion, because it satisfies IIA.

=== Plurality voting ===
Any candidate receiving more than 50% of the vote will be elected by plurality.

=== Instant runoff ===
Instant-runoff voting satisfies majority--if a candidate is rated first by 50% of the electorate, they will win in the first round.

=== Borda count ===
For example 100 voters cast the following votes:

Preference	Voters
A>B>C	55
B>C>A	35
C>B>A	10

A has 110 Borda points (55 × 2 + 35 × 0 + 10 × 0). B has 135 Borda points (55 × 1 + 35 × 2 + 10 × 1). C has 55 Borda points (55 × 0 + 35 × 1 + 10 × 2).

Preference	Points
A	110
B	135
C	55

Candidate A is the first choice of a majority of voters but candidate B wins the election.

==== Condorcet methods ====
Any Condorcet method will automatically satisfy the majority criterion.

=== Cardinal methods ===
==== Score voting ====
For example 100 voters cast the following votes:

Ballot			Voters
A	B	C	Voters
10	9	0	80
0	10	0	20

Candidate B would win with a total of 80 × 9 + 20 × 10 = 720 + 200 = 920 rating points, versus 800 for candidate A.

Because candidate A is rated higher than candidate B by a (substantial) majority of the voters, but B is declared winner, this voting system fails to satisfy the criterion due to using additional information about the voters' opinion. Conversely, if the bloc of voters who rate A highest know they are in the majority, such as from pre-election polls, they can strategically give a maximal rating to A, a minimal rating to all others, and thereby guarantee the election of their favorite candidate. In this regard, if there exists a majority coalition, the coalition will have the ability to coordinate and elect their favorite candidate.

==== STAR voting ====
STAR voting fails majority, but satisfies the majority loser criterion.

==== Highest medians ====
It is controversial how to interpret the term "prefer" in the definition of the criterion. If majority support is interpreted in a relative sense, with a majority rating a preferred candidate above any other, the method does not pass, even with only two candidates. If the word "prefer" is interpreted in an absolute sense, as rating the preferred candidate with the highest available rating, then it does.

===== Criterion 1 =====
If "A is preferred" means that the voter gives a better grade to A than to every other candidate, majority judgment can fail catastrophically. Consider the case below when n is large:

Ballots (Bolded medians)
# ballots	A's score	B's score
n	100/100	52/100
1	**50/100**	**51/100**
n	49/100	0/100

A is preferred by a majority, but B's median is Good and A's median is only Fair, so B would win. In fact, A can be preferred by up to (but not including) 100% of all voters, an exceptionally severe violation of the criterion.

===== Criterion 2 =====
If we define the majority criterion as requiring a voter to uniquely top-rate candidate A, then this system passes the criterion; any candidate who receives the highest grade from a majority of voters receives the highest grade (and so can only be defeated by another candidate who has majority support).

== See also ==
- Mutual majority criterion
- Voting system
- Voting system criterion
- Condorcet criterion
