= Independence of clones criterion =

Property of electoral systems

In social choice theory, the independence of (irrelevant) clones criterion says that adding a clone, i.e. a new candidate very similar to an already-existing candidate, should not spoil the results. It can be considered a weak form of the independence of irrelevant alternatives (IIA) criterion that nevertheless is failed by a number of voting rules. A method that passes the criterion is said to be clone independent.

A group of candidates are called clones if they are always ranked together, placed side-by-side, by every voter; no voter ranks any of the non-clone candidates between or equal to the clones. In other words, the process of cloning a candidate involves taking an existing candidate C, then replacing them with several candidates C1, C2... who are slotted into the original ballots in the spot where C previously was, with the clones being arranged in any order. If a set of clones contains at least two candidates, the criterion requires that deleting one of the clones must not increase or decrease the winning chance of any candidate not in the set of clones.

Ranked pairs, the Schulze method, and systems that unconditionally satisfy independence of irrelevant alternatives are clone independent. Instant-runoff voting passes as long as tied ranks are disallowed. If they are allowed, its clone independence depends on specific details of how the criterion is defined and how tied ranks are handled.

Rated methods like range voting or majority judgment that are spoilerproof under certain conditions are also clone independent under those conditions.

The Borda count, minimax, Kemeny–Young, Copeland's method, plurality, and the two-round system all fail the independence of clones criterion. Voting methods that limit the number of allowed ranks also fail the criterion, because the addition of clones can leave voters with insufficient space to express their preferences about other candidates. For similar reasons, ballot formats that impose such a limit may cause an otherwise clone-independent method to fail.

This criterion is very weak, as adding a substantially similar (but not quite identical) candidate to a race can still substantially affect the results and cause vote splitting. For example, the center squeeze pathology that affects instant-runoff voting means that several similar (but not identical) candidates competing in the same race will tend to hurt each other's chances of winning.

== Clone directions ==
Election methods that fail independence of clones can do so in three ways.

If adding a clone of the winner can make the winner lose, the method is clone negative and exhibits vote-splitting. First-preference plurality is a common example of such a method.

If adding a clone of a loser can make either the loser or their clone win, the method is clone positive and exhibits teaming. The Borda count is an example of a clone-positive method; in fact, the method is so clone-positive that any candidate can simply "clone their way to victory", and the winner being the coalition that runs the most clones.

A method can also fail the independence of clones criterion without being clone-positive or clone-negative. This is called crowding, and happens when cloning a losing candidate changes the winner from one non-clone to a different non-clone. Copeland's method is an example of a method that exhibits crowding.

== Examples ==
=== Borda count ===
Consider an election in which there are two candidates, A and B. Suppose the voters have the following preferences:

66%: A>B	34%: B>A

Candidate A would receive 66% Borda points (66%×1 + 34%×0) and B would receive 34% (66%×0 + 34%×1). Thus candidate A would win by a 66% landslide.

Now suppose supporters of B nominate an additional candidate, B_{2}, that is very similar to B but considered inferior by all voters. For the 66% who prefer A, B continues to be their second choice. For the 34% who prefer B, A continues to be their least preferred candidate. Now the voters' preferences are as follows:

66%: A>B>B_{2}	34%: B>B_{2}>A

Candidate A now has 132% Borda points (66%×2 + 34%×0). B has 134% (66%×1 + 34%×2). B_{2} has 34% (66%×0 + 34%×1). The nomination of B_{2} changes the winner from A to B, overturning the landslide, even though the additional information about voters' preferences is redundant due to the similarity of B_{2} to B.

Similar examples can be constructed to show that given the Borda count, any arbitrarily large landslide can be overturned by adding enough candidates (assuming at least one voter prefers the landslide loser). For example, to overturn a 90% landslide preference for A over B, add 9 alternatives similar/inferior to B. Then A's score would be 900% (90%×10 + 10%×0) and B's score would be 910% (90%×9 + 10%×10).

No knowledge of the voters' preferences is needed to exploit this strategy. Factions could simply nominate as many alternatives as possible that are similar to their preferred alternative.

In typical elections, game theory suggests this manipulability of Borda can be expected to be a serious problem, particularly when a significant number of voters can be expected to vote their sincere order of preference (as in public elections, where many voters are not strategically sophisticated; cite Michael R. Alvarez of Caltech). Small minorities typically have the power to nominate additional candidates, and typically it is easy to find additional candidates that are similar.

In the context of people running for office, people can take similar positions on the issues, and in the context of voting on proposals, it is easy to construct similar proposals. Game theory suggests that all factions would seek to nominate as many similar candidates as possible since the winner would depend on the number of similar candidates, regardless of the voters' preferences.

=== Copeland ===
These examples show that Copeland's method violates the Independence of clones criterion.

==== Crowding ====
Copeland's method is vulnerable to crowding, that is the outcome of the election is changed by adding (non-winning) clones of a non-winning candidate. Assume five candidates A, B, B_{2}, B_{3} and C and 4 voters with the following preferences:

# of voters	Preferences
1	A > B_{3} > B > B_{2} > C
1	B_{3} > B > B_{2} > C > A
2	C > A > B_{2} > B > B_{3}

Note, that B, B_{2} and B_{3} form a clone set.

===== Clones not nominated =====
If only one of the clones would compete, preferences would be as follows:

# of voters	Preferences
1	A > B > C
1	B > C > A
2	C > A > B

The results would be tabulated as follows:

Pairwise Preferences
		X		
		A	B	C
Y	A		[X] 1 [Y] 3	[X] 3 [Y] 1
Y	B	[X] 3 [Y] 1		[X] 2 [Y] 2
Y	C	[X] 1 [Y] 3	[X] 2 [Y] 2	
Pairwise election results (won-tied-lost):		1–0–1	0–1–1	1–1–0

- [X] indicates voters who preferred the candidate listed in the column caption to the candidate listed in the row caption
- [Y] indicates voters who preferred the candidate listed in the row caption to the candidate listed in the column caption

Result: C has one win and no defeats, A has one win and one defeat. Thus, C is elected Copeland winner.

===== Clones nominated =====
Assume, all three clones would compete. The preferences would be the following:

# of voters	Preferences
1	A > B_{3} > B > B_{2} > C
1	B_{3} > B > B_{2} > C > A
2	C > A > B_{2} > B > B_{3}

The results would be tabulated as follows:

Pairwise Preferences
		X				
		A	B	B_{2}	B_{3}	C
Y	A		[X] 1 [Y] 3	[X] 1 [Y] 3	[X] 1 [Y] 3	[X] 3 [Y] 1
Y	B	[X] 3 [Y] 1		[X] 2 [Y] 2	[X] 2 [Y] 2	[X] 2 [Y] 2
Y	B_{2}	[X] 3 [Y] 1	[X] 2 [Y] 2		[X] 2 [Y] 2	[X] 2 [Y] 2
Y	B_{3}	[X] 3 [Y] 1	[X] 2 [Y] 2	[X] 2 [Y] 2		[X] 2 [Y] 2
Y	C	[X] 1 [Y] 3	[X] 2 [Y] 2	[X] 2 [Y] 2	[X] 2 [Y] 2	
Pairwise election results (won-tied-lost):		3–0–1	0–3–1	0–3–1	0–3–1	1–3–0

Result: Still, C has one win and no defeat, but now A has three wins and one defeat. Thus, A is elected Copeland winner.

===== Conclusion =====
A benefits from the clones of the candidate he defeats, while C cannot benefit from the clones because C ties with all of them. Thus, by adding two clones of the non-winning candidate B, the winner has changed. Thus, Copeland's method is vulnerable against crowding and fails the independence of clones criterion.

==== Teaming ====
Copeland's method is also vulnerable against teaming, that is adding clones raises the winning chances of the set of clones. Again, assume five candidates A, B, B_{2}, B_{3} and C and 2 voters with the following preferences:

# of voters	Preferences
1	A > C > B > B_{3} > B_{2}
1	B > B_{2} > B_{3} > A > C

Note, that B, B_{2} and B_{3} form a clone set.

===== Clones not nominated =====
Assume that only one of the clones would compete. The preferences would be as follows:

# of voters	Preferences
1	A > C > B
1	B > A > C

The results would be tabulated as follows:

Pairwise Preferences
		X		
		A	B	C
Y	A		[X] 1 [Y] 1	[X] 0 [Y] 2
Y	B	[X] 1 [Y] 1		[X] 1 [Y] 1
Y	C	[X] 2 [Y] 0	[X] 1 [Y] 1	
Pairwise election results (won-tied-lost):		1–1–0	0–2–0	0–1–1

Result: A has one win and no defeats, B has no wins or defeats so A is elected Copeland winner.

===== Clones nominated =====
If all three clones competed, the preferences would be as follows:

# of voters	Preferences
1	A > C > B > B_{3} > B_{2}
1	B > B_{2} > B_{3} > A > C

The results would be tabulated as follows:

Pairwise Preferences
		X				
		A	B	B_{2}	B_{3}	C
Y	A		[X] 1 [Y] 1	[X] 1 [Y] 1	[X] 1 [Y] 1	[X] 0 [Y] 2
Y	B	[X] 1 [Y] 1		[X] 0 [Y] 2	[X] 0 [Y] 2	[X] 1 [Y] 1
Y	B_{2}	[X] 1 [Y] 1	[X] 2 [Y] 0		[X] 1 [Y] 1	[X] 1 [Y] 1
Y	B_{3}	[X] 1 [Y] 1	[X] 2 [Y] 0	[X] 1 [Y] 1		[X] 1 [Y] 1
Y	C	[X] 2 [Y] 0	[X] 1 [Y] 1	[X] 1 [Y] 1	[X] 1 [Y] 1	
Pairwise election results (won-tied-lost):		1–3–0	2–2–0	0–3–1	0–3–1	0–3–1

Result: A has one win and no defeat, but now B has two wins and no defeat. Thus, B is elected Copeland winner.

===== Conclusion =====
B benefits from adding inferior clones, while A cannot benefit from the clones because he ties with all of them. So, by adding two clones of B, B changed from loser to winner. Thus, Copeland's method is vulnerable against Teaming and fails the Independence of clones criterion.

=== Plurality voting ===
Suppose there are two candidates, A and B, and 55% of the voters prefer A over B. A would win the election, 55% to 45%. But suppose the supporters of B also nominate an alternative similar to A, named A_{2}. Assume a significant number of the voters who prefer A over B also prefer A_{2} over A. When they vote for A_{2}, this reduces A's total below 45%, causing B to win.

A 55%	A 30%
A_{2} not present	A_{2} 25%
B 45%	B 45%

=== Range voting ===
Range voting satisfies the independence of clones criterion under the conditions that it satisfies independence of irrelevant alternatives. Whenever the voters use an absolute scale that does not depend on the candidates running, range voting satisfies IIA and thus is also clone-independent.

However, if the voters use relative judgments, then their ratings of different candidates can change as clones drop out, which can lead range voting to fail clone independence. This can be seen by a simple example:

In range voting, the voter can give the maximum possible score to their most preferred alternative and the minimum possible score to their least preferred alternative. This can be done strategically or just as a natural way of anchoring one's ratings to the candidates that matter in the election.

Begin by supposing there are 3 alternatives: A, B and B_{2}, where B_{2} is similar to B but considered inferior by the supporters of A and B. The voters supporting A would have the order of preference "A>B>B_{2}" so that they give A the maximum possible score, they give B_{2} the minimum possible score, and they give B a score that's somewhere in between (greater than the minimum). The supporters of B would have the order of preference "B>B_{2}>A", so they give B the maximum possible score, A the minimum score and B_{2} a score somewhere in between. Assume B narrowly wins the election.

Now suppose B_{2} isn't nominated. The voters supporting A who would have given B a score somewhere in between would now give B the minimum score while the supporters of B will still give B the maximum score, changing the winner to A. This teaming effect violates the criterion. Note, that if the voters that support B would prefer B_{2} to B, this result would not hold, since removing B_{2} would raise the score B receives from his supporters in an analogous way as the score he receives from the supporters of A would decrease.

The conclusion that can be drawn is that considering all voters voting in a certain relative way, range voting creates an incentive to nominate additional alternatives that are similar to one you prefer, but considered clearly inferior by his voters and by the voters of his opponent, since this can be expected to cause the voters supporting the opponent to raise their score of the one you prefer (because it looks better by comparison to the inferior ones), but not his own voters to lower their score.

=== Approval voting ===
The analysis of approval voting is more difficult, since the independence of clones criterion involves rankings and approval ballots contain less information than ranked ones.

Approval passes under the same preconditions as range voting, since passing independence of irrelevant alternatives implies clone independence.

In addition, Approval passes if ties are broken in a clone-independent manner and the clones are perfect clones, meaning that everybody who approves of one of them approves of all of them, and everybody who disapproves of one of them disapproves of all of them.

=== Kemeny method ===
This example shows that the Kemeny method violates the Independence of clones criterion. Assume five candidates A, B_{1}, B_{2}, B_{3} and C and 13 voters with the following preferences:

# of voters	Preferences
4	A > B_{1} > B_{2} > B_{3} > C
5	B_{1} > B_{2} > B_{3} > C > A
4	C > A > B_{1} > B_{2} > B_{3}

Note, that B_{1}, B_{2} and B_{3} form a clone set.

==== Clones not nominated ====
Assume only one of the clones competes. The preferences would be:

# of voters	Preferences
4	A > B_{1} > C
5	B_{1} > C > A
4	C > A > B_{1}

The Kemeny method arranges the pairwise comparison counts in the following tally table:

All possible pairs of choice names		Number of votes with indicated preference		
All possible pairs of choice names		Prefer X over Y	Equal preference	Prefer Y over X
X = A	Y = B_{1}	8	0	5
X = A	Y = C	4	0	9
X = B_{1}	Y = C	9	0	4

The ranking scores of all possible rankings are:

Preferences	1. vs 2.	1. vs 3.	2. vs 3.	Total
A > B_{1} > C	8	4	9	21
A > C > B_{1}	4	8	4	16
B_{1} > A > C	5	9	4	18
B_{1} > C > A	9	5	9	23
C > A > B_{1}	9	4	8	21
C > B_{1} > A	4	9	5	18

Result: The ranking B_{1} > C > A has the highest ranking score. Thus, B_{1} wins ahead of C and A.

==== Clones nominated ====
Assume all three clones compete. The preferences would be:

# of voters	Preferences
4	A > B_{1} > B_{2} > B_{3} > C
5	B_{1} > B_{2} > B_{3} > C > A
4	C > A > B_{1} > B_{2} > B_{3}

The Kemeny method arranges the pairwise comparison counts in the following tally table (with $i \in \{1, 2, 3\}$) :

All possible pairs of choice names		Number of votes with indicated preference		
All possible pairs of choice names		Prefer X over Y	Equal preference	Prefer Y over X
X = A	Y = B_{i}	8	0	5
X = A	Y = C	4	0	9
X = B_{i}	Y = C	9	0	4
X = B_{1}	Y = B_{2}	13	0	0
X = B_{1}	Y = B_{3}	13	0	0
X = B_{2}	Y = B_{3}	13	0	0

Since the clones have identical results against all other candidates, they have to be ranked one after another in the optimal ranking. More over, the optimal ranking within the clones is unambiguous: B_{1} > B_{2} > B_{3}. In fact, for computing the results, the three clones can be seen as one united candidate B, whose wins and defeats are three times as strong as of every single clone. The ranking scores of all possible rankings with respect to that are:

Preferences	1. vs 2.	1. vs 3.	2. vs 3.	Total
A > B > C	24	4	27	55
A > C > B	4	24	12	40
B > A > C	15	27	4	46
B > C > A	27	15	9	51
C > A > B	9	12	24	45
C > B > A	12	9	15	36

Result: The ranking A > B_{1} > B_{2} > B_{3} > C has the highest ranking score. Thus, A wins ahead of the clones B_{i} and C.

==== Conclusion ====
A benefits from the two clones of B_{1} because A's win is multiplied by three. So, by adding two clones of B, B changed from winner to loser. Thus, the Kemeny method is vulnerable against spoilers and fails the independence of clones criterion.

=== Minimax ===
This example shows that the minimax method violates the Independence of clones criterion. Assume four candidates A, B_{1}, B_{2} and B_{3} and 9 voters with the following preferences:

# of voters	Preferences
3	A > B_{1} > B_{2} > B_{3}
3	B_{2} > B_{3} > B_{1} > A
2	B_{3} > B_{1} > B_{2} > A
1	A > B_{3} > B_{1} > B_{2}

Note, that B_{1}, B_{2} and B_{3} form a clone set.

Since all preferences are strict rankings (no equals are present), all three minimax methods (winning votes, margins and pairwise opposite) elect the same winners.

==== Clones not nominated ====
Assume only one of the clones would compete. The preferences would be:

# of voters	Preferences
4	A > B_{1}
5	B_{1} > A

The results would be tabulated as follows:

Pairwise election results
		X	
		A	B_{1}
Y	A		[X] 5 [Y] 4
Y	B_{1}	[X] 4 [Y] 5	
Pairwise election results (won-tied-lost):		0–1	1–0
worst pairwise defeat (winning votes):		5	0
worst pairwise defeat (margins):		1	0
worst pairwise opposition:		5	4

- [X] indicates voters who preferred the candidate listed in the column caption to the candidate listed in the row caption
- [Y] indicates voters who preferred the candidate listed in the row caption to the candidate listed in the column caption

Result: B is the Condorcet winner. Thus, B is elected minimax winner.

==== Clones nominated ====
Now assume all three clones would compete. The preferences would be as follows:

# of voters	Preferences
3	A > B_{1} > B_{2} > B_{3}
3	B_{2} > B_{3} > B_{1} > A
2	B_{3} > B_{1} > B_{2} > A
1	A > B_{3} > B_{1} > B_{2}

The results would be tabulated as follows:

Pairwise election results
		X			
		A	B_{1}	B_{2}	B_{3}
Y	A		[X] 5 [Y] 4	[X] 5 [Y] 4	[X] 5 [Y] 4
Y	B_{1}	[X] 4 [Y] 5		[X] 3 [Y] 6	[X] 6 [Y] 3
Y	B_{2}	[X] 4 [Y] 5	[X] 6 [Y] 3		[X] 3 [Y] 6
Y	B_{3}	[X] 4 [Y] 5	[X] 3 [Y] 6	[X] 6 [Y] 3	
Pairwise election results (won-tied-lost):		0–0–3	2–0–1	2–0–1	2–0–1
worst pairwise defeat (winning votes):		5	6	6	6
worst pairwise defeat (margins):		1	3	3	3
worst pairwise opposition:		5	6	6	6

Result: A has the closest biggest defeat. Thus, A is elected minimax winner.

==== Conclusion ====
By adding clones, the Condorcet winner B_{1} becomes defeated. All three clones beat each other in clear defeats. A benefits from that. So, by adding two clones of B, B changed from winner to loser. Thus, the minimax method is vulnerable against spoilers and fails the independence of clones criterion.

=== STAR voting ===
STAR voting consists of an automatic runoff between the two candidates with the highest rated scores. This example involves clones with nearly identical scores, and shows teaming.

==== Clones not nominated ====
	Scores		
# of voters	Amy	Brian	Clancy
2	5	2	1
4	4	2	1
11	0	1	1

The finalists are Amy and Brian, and Brian beats Amy pairwise and thus wins.

==== Clones nominated ====
	Scores			
# of voters	Amy	Amy's clone	Brian	Clancy
2	5	5	2	1
2	4	3	2	1
2	4	5	2	1
11	0	0	1	1

The finalists are Amy and her clone, and Amy's clone wins.

== See also ==
- Strategic nomination
- Spoiler effect
