= Spatial voting =

Model simulating voters in an election

In political science and social choice theory, the spatial (sometimes ideological or ideal-point) model of voting, also known as the Hotelling–Downs model, is a mathematical model of voting behavior. It describes voters and candidates as varying along one or more axes (or dimensions), where each axis represents an attribute of the candidate that voters care about. Voters are modeled as having an ideal point in this space and preferring candidates closer to this point over those who are further away; these kinds of preferences are called single-peaked.

The most common example of a spatial model is a political spectrum or compass, such as the traditional left–right axis, but issue spaces can be more complex. For example, a study of German voters found at least four dimensions were required to adequately represent all political parties.

Besides ideology, a dimension can represent any attribute of the candidates, such as their views on one particular issue. It can also represent non-ideological properties of the candidates, such as their age, experience, or health.

== Accuracy ==
A study of three-candidate elections analyzed 12 different models of voter behavior, including several variations of the impartial culture model, and found the spatial model to be the most accurate to real-world ranked-ballot election data. (Their real-world data was 883 three-candidate elections of 350 to 1,957 voters, extracted from 84 ranked-ballot elections of the Electoral Reform Society, and 913 elections derived from the 1970–2004 American National Election Studies thermometer scale surveys, with 759 to 2,521 "voters.") A previous study by the same authors had found similar results, comparing 6 different models to the ANES data.

A study of evaluative voting methods developed several models for generating rated ballots and recommended the spatial model as the most realistic. (Their empirical evaluation was based on two elections, the 2009 European Election Survey of 8 candidates by 972 voters, and the Voter Autrement poll of the 2017 French presidential election, including 26,633 voters and 5 candidates.)

== History ==
The earliest roots of the model are the one-dimensional Hotelling's law of 1929 and Black's median voter theorem of 1948. Anthony Downs, in his 1957 book An Economic Theory of Democracy, further developed the model to explain the dynamics of party competition, which became the foundation for much follow-on research.

== See also ==
- Issue voting § Models of issue voting
- Location model - a model that demonstrates consumer preference for particular brands of goods and their locations.
- Budget-proposal aggregation - another problem in which agents vote by reporting their ideal outcome.
