= Issues affecting the single transferable vote =

There are a number of complications and issues surrounding the application and use of single transferable vote proportional representation that form the basis of discussions between its advocates and detractors.

== Complexity ==
Among electorates considering the adoption of STV, there is a frequently expressed concern that PR-STV is relatively complex compared with plurality voting methods. For example, the Canadian province of British Columbia held a referendum on adopting BC-STV in 2005. When "no" voters were asked why they were voting against STV, they gave their reason as "wasn't knowledgeable". The referendum resulted in a 56.16% vote in favour of adopting BC-STV, whether or not voters were any better informed, though the system was never adopted due to institutional barriers.

The use of STV is more complex than first-past-the-post but for the voter, STV is fairly simple. The vote counting under STV is simpler than primaries, which are no longer necessary if STV is used.

As with all voting systems, even if PR-STV is understood, areas of controversy surrounding its use remain. PR-STV is a form of proportional representation so issues relating to that form of electing also impacts acceptance of STV. As well, STV uses ranked voting, an unknown quantity in many places in the world.

Arguments for and against proportional representation in general are frequently referenced in debates among electorates considering STV. STV is a family of systems, and the specific implications of the use of a particular STV system is sometimes an issue.

Most of the arguments for and against STV and proportional representation in general are based around expected outcomes of the specific alternative proposed system, and not on the system itself.

== Effects on parties, factions and candidates ==
STV differs from all other proportional representation systems in actual use in that representatives are directly elected by the voters, and candidates of one party can be elected on transfers from voters who initially gave their vote to a candidate of another party. Hence, the use of STV may reduce the role of political parties in the electoral process and correspondingly partisanship in the resulting government.

Unlike proportional representation systems employing party lists, voters in STV are not explicitly constrained by parties even when they do exist; voters may ignore candidate party labels and mix their ranked candidate preferences among parties.

Similarly, candidates may achieve electoral success by obtaining a quota of voters not generally within their own party, perhaps by winning transfers from moderates or by championing a specific issue contrary to party doctrine. STV advocates argue that, by requiring a candidate to appeal to the supporters of other candidates for their second and further preferences, it reduces adversarial confrontation, and indeed, gives a substantial advantage to candidates that broaden their appeal by being not only collegial but as open-minded and flexible in their principles as they can manage. STV detractors see that as a flaw, arguing that political parties should be able to structure public debate, mobilize and engage the electorate, and develop policy alternatives.

Unlike List PR, PR-STV can be used in elections in organizations without any political parties at all, such as in municipal non-partisan elections, trade unions, clubs, and schools.

Some practices overlaid on PR-STV, however, may encourage the role of political parties and actually strengthen them. Australian Senate elections use a combination of large districts (statewide elections), mandatory complete ballots (preferencing all candidates/full preferential voting), and compulsory voting has resulted - since they were introduced in 1983. This results in the near 95% usage of partisan group voting tickets, so political parties have significant power in determining election results by adjusting the relative ordering of their candidates on the party list.

Successful campaign strategy in PR-STV elections may differ significantly from other voting systems. In particular, individual candidates in STV have little incentive for negative campaign advertising, as reducing a particular opponent's ranking among voters does not necessarily elevate one's own; if negative campaigning is seen as distasteful by the voters, the practice may even prove harmful to the attacking candidate.

Conversely, in order to avoid elimination in early counting rounds by having too few first preference votes, candidates have a significant incentive to convince voters to rank them explicitly first as their top preference, rather than merely higher. This incentive to attain first preferences, in turn, may lead to a strategy of candidates placing greater importance on a core group of supporters. Avoiding early elimination, however, is usually not enough to win election, as a candidate must still subsequently win enough votes on transfers to achieve the quota. Consequently, strategies that sacrifice wide secondary support in favor of primary support amidst a core group may ultimately fail unless the group is large enough to have quota.

There are also tactical considerations for political parties in the number of candidates they stand in an election where full ranking on the ballots is not required. Standing too few candidates may result in all of them being elected in the early stages, and votes being transferred to candidates of other parties, instead of being used to elect candidates of the party.

Standing too many candidates might result in first-preference votes being spread too thinly amongst them, and consequently several potential winners with broad second-preference appeal may be eliminated before others are elected or eliminated and their second-preference votes distributed. The risk of such a missed opportunity is larger when voters do not stick tightly to their preferred party's candidates.

However, if voters mark their preferences for candidates from a particular party before any other candidates, then running too many candidates is not an issue. In Malta, where voters tend to stick tightly to party preferences, parties frequently stand more candidates than there are seats to be elected. Similarly, in Australian Senate elections, voters tend to vote along party lines due to the relative ease of endorsing a party slate. The parties do not encourage voters to peruse the party list but urge them to take it on trust, as evidenced by their how-to-vote cards distributed outside polling booths. Trusting in the process, voters generally do not individually cast their own unique ranking of preferences.

In the Republic of Ireland, the main political parties usually give careful consideration as to how many candidates to put forward in the separate Dáil (parliamentary) districts. Transfers are often not along party lines, but rather go towards more prominent local personalities. Election posters for the most prominent candidate of a political party usually list preferred 2nd (and possibly 3rd) preferences for that party.

== Electoral stasis ==
Electoral stasis is a condition that can arise when an electorate cannot change the composition of the legislative chamber, regardless of a swing occurring in a general election. A safe seat in a single-member electoral system is one that is in electoral stasis. Seats under proportional representation systems, such as STV, can also be in electoral stasis. Political party strategists ignore these “safe seats” and allocate resources to other districts.

In an district electing two members, the quota for successful candidacy, 33.34%, is easy for both parties to reach in a two-party-dominated assembly, if their core demographic voter base is larger than the quota. For example, in a district returning three members, electoral stasis occurs when the weaker party has only a quota (about 25%) and one seat, and the more-popular party wins two seats. The situation will only change if the weaker party can rise to about 50 percent of the vote. This change is not likely so the district is seen as likely to produce two safe seats for the larger party.

The fewer the members elected in a district, the more likely that the electorate (and district) will be in electoral stasis. The larger the number of members returned by a district, the greater the chance that a voter that changes their vote can influence the outcome of the election.

In a district with ten members, quota is about 9 percent, and a change from half of quota, not enough to elect anyone, to a number of votes enough to elect one candidate is only 5 percent.

As well, with the use of list PR or STV in a district, even a small change in voting behaviour might produce a change in the representation elected. The ability of a voter to vote directly for a candidate also means that even if a party takes the same number of seats, the members elected might be quite different from election to election. Such election systems also ensure that a party with more votes takes more seats across a city or an area, while first past the post allows a party with just half or two-thirds of the votes cast by that group of voters to take all the seats.

== Ballot design ==
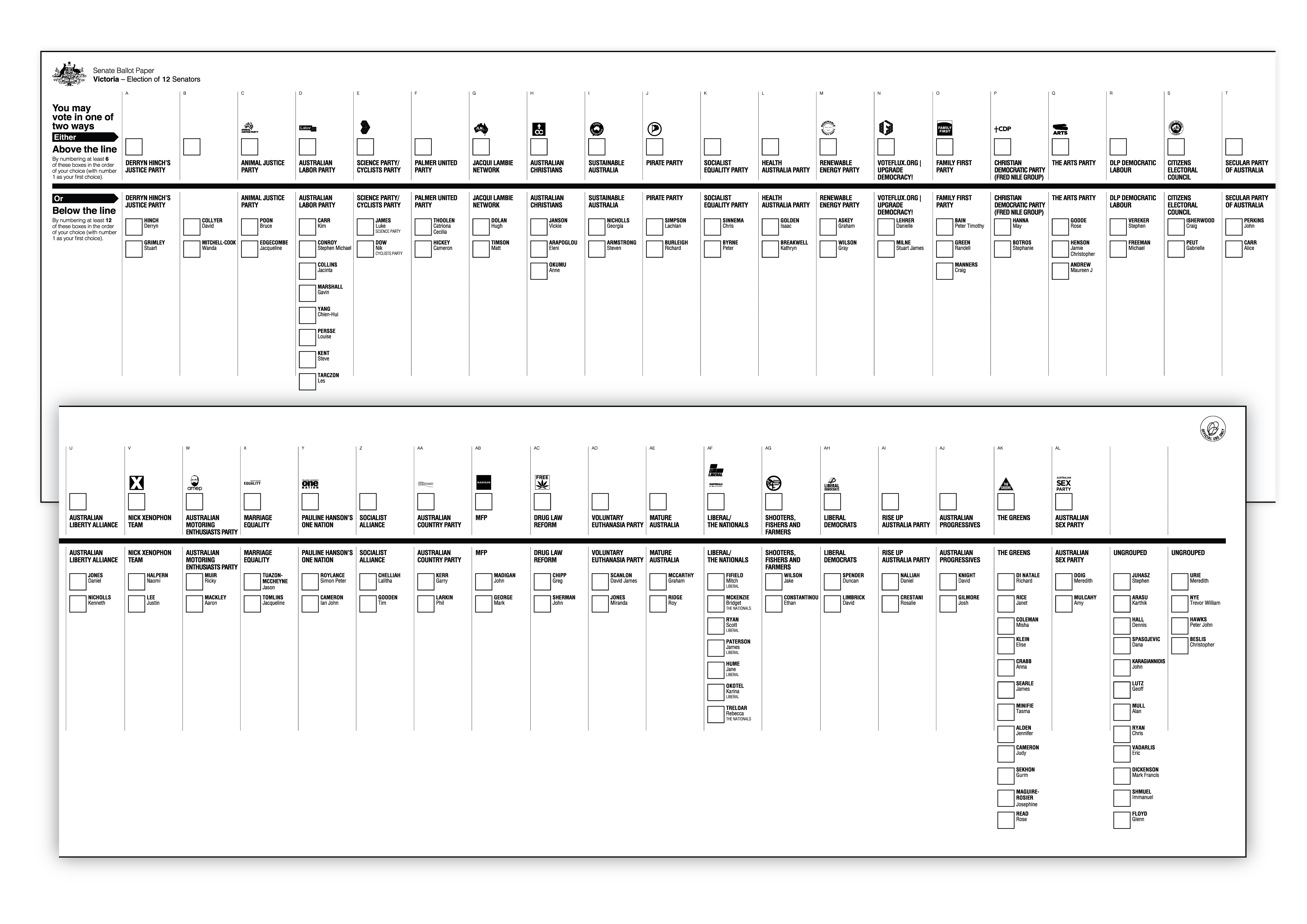
Senate ballot paper used in Victoria for 2016

As seen above, voters in an STV election rank candidates on a preferential ballot. The rankings are used as contingency votes (back-up options).

STV systems in use in different countries vary both as to ballot design and as to how many preferences each voter must mark (full preferential voting, optional-preferential voting or semi-optional preferential voting). In the Republic of Ireland and Northern Ireland, voters are permitted to rank as many or as few candidates as they wish. Consequently, voters sometimes, for example, rank only the candidates of a single party, or of their most preferred parties. Some voters, especially if they do not understand the system, "bullet vote", only express a first preference. Allowing voters to rank only as many candidates as they wish grants them greater freedom but can lead to a voter ranking so few candidates that their vote eventually becomes "exhausted". That happens if at a certain point during the count it needs to be transferred but cannot be transferred because there are no markings on the ballot or the marked preferences have all been either elected or eliminated already and none of the remaining candidates were indicated as choices by the voter. It thereby loses an opportunity to influence the result. (In First Past the Post elections, many, sometimes most, votes are disregarded, as there is no opportunity to mark back-up preferences.)

To the extent that voters mark back-up preferences and the back-up preferences are consulted - many are not consulted even if marked - the portion of votes ignored under STV is less than under First Past The Post. Back-up preferences are not consulted if the vote is cast at the start for a candidate who wins in the end as the last seat is filled, or cast for a candidate who is eliminated at the end. They are also not used if they are marked for a candidate who has already been elected or eliminated.

To prevent exhausted ballots, some PR-STV systems oblige voters to give a complete ordering of all of the candidates in an election. (If a voter does not rank all candidates, their ballot may be considered spoilt outright or considered spoiled at the point when the lack of a marked preference affects the count, a loophole used by those who cast a Langer vote).

However, when there is a large number of candidates, the work put on the voter by the full preferential voting rule may prove burdensome and can lead to random voting, or "donkey voting" in which a voter who does not have a strong opinion about the candidates on offer simply ranks them in the given order. Some jurisdictions compromise by setting a minimum number of preferences that must be filled for a ballot paper to be valid (semi-optional preferential voting). (For example, Tasmania requires the voter to mark at least five preferences.)

To make it easy to create what is called a complete ballot, some PR-STV systems provide the option of using group voting tickets rather than the voter having to mark manually a long list of individual preferences. For example, in elections to the Australian Senate from 1984 until 2013 a voter could either rank the candidates individually "below the line" or place the number 1 in a box "above the line" to vote for a predetermined ordering of candidates drawn up by one of the political parties. This system diminished the emphasis on individual candidates and increases the power of party leaders that submit the predetermined rankings; in practice it may even lead to a system resembling, but not being identical to party-list proportional representation. However it was still possible for independent candidates to be elected as has been shown in the 2007 Federal Senate elections where Nick Xenophon was elected. In 2016 group tickets were abolished to avoid undue influence of preference deals and a form of optional preferential voting was introduced.

As well, in some above-the-line voting systems, voters can mark back-up preferences for whole party slates (numbering as many boxes as they wish), along with preferences for individual candidates below the line. Some do not require voter to fill all of the boxes. Both above and below the line voting now use semi-optional preferential or optional preferential voting.

In Australian Senate elections starting 2016, above the line voting, with back-up preferences, is allowed. Voters are instructed to number at least their six most-preferred party slates; however, a "savings provision" is in place to ensure that ballots will still be counted if less than six are given. For below the line, voters are required to mark at least their top 12 preferences. Voters are free to continue numbering as many preferences as they like beyond the minimum number specified. Changes made in 2026 made above-the-line voting more complicated (because of need to mark back-up preferences) while making below-the-line voting more simple (the need now only to mark 12 candidates).

A savings provision allows ballot papers with at least 6 below the line preferences to be formal.

=== Alphabetic ordering ===
The simplest way to list candidates on a ballot paper is alphabetically, though they may also be grouped by party. However, any fixed ordering will give some candidates an unfair advantage, because some voters, consciously or otherwise, are influenced in their ordering of candidates by the order found on the ballot paper. For example, studies conducted in the Republic of Ireland, where candidates are listed alphabetically, have shown that candidates whose surnames begin with an early letter in the alphabet enjoy a small electoral advantage over candidates with later letters. To solve this problem some systems involve a random ordering of candidates, or an ordering that changes from one ballot paper to another (the latter is often called the Robson rotation, after Neil Robson, a Tasmanian MHA who championed such a system).

In the Irish Dáil (lower house of parliament) elected in 2002, about 4.5% of members had surnames beginning with A, 8% beginning with B, and 12% beginning with C. From listings in the Eircom telephone directories for the 01, 06 and 07/09 areas combined, the expected percentages would be about 1.5%, 7% and 9.5% respectively. Similar deviations from the norm have been noted after previous elections. The effect seems to be minimal, as the Dáil median surname currently falls within the letter K, which accurately reflects the distribution of Irish names. An analysis of likely voting patterns seems to predict a small bias of this kind. A voter votes 1 for the candidate they most favour. If they wish to support other candidates of the same party, but have no strong preference between them, the voter is likely to number them downwards from the top of the ballot sheet, in normal reading fashion. Later preferences to candidates of another party are likely to be numbered in the same way. If candidates' names are listed alphabetically, this pattern will mean that earlier preferences will go to candidates earlier in the alphabet. Over a series of elections, such a minor bias would have a cumulative effect, as elected members stand for election again. In Ireland, it has been suggested that names on ballot papers should be printed in random order to prevent this.

In New Zealand's local body elections, each ballot paper is randomly ordered but alphabetic effects are still observed, probably due to the provision of an accompanying booklet that lists the candidates alphabetically. In Australia, the "four As" ploy in the 1937 Senate election in New South Wales resulted in legislation in 1940 that changed the order of candidates names from an alphabetical ranking to a grouping in party columns on a horizontal ballot paper where the order of candidates' names within each party column were allowed to be predetermined by the party. That aspect of the Senate ballot paper still applies.

== Proportionality ==
The outcome of voting under PR-STV is proportional in party terms within a single election to the collective preference of voters, based on votes as cast. Under STV voters have opportunity to actually indicate their real preferences (not to engage in strategic voting/tactical voting). Where voters mark preferences along party lines, the representation elected reflects first preferences more fully than in elections where voter have their votes cross party lines. However, due to other voting mechanisms usually used in conjunction with STV, such as a district or constituency system, an election using STV may not guarantee proportionality across all districts put together. Differential turnout across districts, for example, may alter the impact of individual votes in different constituencies, and when combined with rounding errors associated with a finite number of winners in each constituency the election as a whole may throw up anomalous results from a purely party perspective.

For example, the 1981 election in Malta resulted in the Labour Party winning a majority of seats despite the Nationalist Party winning 51% of the first-preference vote. Controversy over the election ultimately resulted in a constitutional crisis, leading to an amendment adjusting the voting system to allow for the possibility of bonus seats and making the Maltese voting system more similar to an open-list PR system; STV alone would also have given the second most popular party a parliamentary majority in the 1987, 1996 and 2008 Maltese elections. This kind of difference due to rounding error can occur with any PR system used at a district level, although greater rounding error occurs with smaller districts and there is a tendency for STV elections to use smaller districts when compared with PR elections employing party lists.

Similarly to differences in voter turnout, instances of malapportionment across districts can also cause disproportionate results for the legislature as a whole, but they are far less disproportionate than non-PR systems. In the PR-STV elections to the Australian Senate, all original states have the same number of senators regardless of population, intended to guard the interests of smaller states like Tasmania and South Australia against larger states like New South Wales and Victoria (both states containing a majority of Australia's population). However, results are proportional within a state; and if preferences are similar across large and small states no major disproportionality is generated. Each of Australia's states are strongly urbanised to a similar (~75% or more), and so rural-urban political divides are similar in each state, resulting in a fairly proportional composition

The New South Wales Legislative Council avoids the use of districts entirely, electing 21 members (half of the Council) at a time using a single, statewide at-large constituency and guaranteeing results that are proportional to the final allocation of preferences.

In Victoria, Australia, legislation ensures that each Legislative Council region contains almost the same number of constituents and elects the same number of legislators in each, also resulting in closely proportional results.

The Western Australian Legislative Council is intentionally malapportioned to give half the seats to non-Perth (largely and remote) areas despite having only 35% of the WA population. This has benefited rural focussed parties like the WA Nationals compared to other parties such as the Greens.

PR-STV differs from other PR systems in that it allows the voter to decide the issues that should matter for them. In most PR systems, the voter can only influence a single aspect - party representation. STV allows the voter to choose other criteria that can be used to create the proportionality: the voters' assessment of their preferences for the candidates is most importantly based on the voters' expectations of how the candidate would act and vote if elected, and that might be influenced by the character, ethnicity, age, place of residence or gender as examples. A perceived problem arises from the fact that voters and the political elite are often not in accord with what sort of proportionality should be achieved. Increased voter choice and control reduces the power and influence of the political elite to determine the political debate.

PR-STV provides proportionality by transferring votes to minimise waste of votes, and therefore also minimises the number of unrepresented voters. In this way PR-STV provides Droop proportionality - an example STV election using the Droop quota method for 9 seats and with no exhausted preferences would guarantee representation to every distinct group of 10% of the voters, with at most just under 10% of the vote being wasted, not used to elect anyone.

Unlike proportional representation methods employing party lists, voters in STV do not explicitly state their preferred political party (with the exception where above-the-line voting systems are in place); this can create difficulty when attempting to analyse how an STV election's results compare with the nationwide party vote tallies.

One common method of estimating the party identification of voters is to assume their most-preferred candidate marked on their ballot represents support to that candidate's party. However this method of estimation may be inaccurate due to presence of independent candidates and of cross-party voting shown by backup preferences (uncertainty as to which party voter supports most strongly). However valid comparisons have and can be made if sufficient data and information are available. In Victoria, Australia, it is possible to make a direct comparison between the Australian Senate election and the Victorian Upper House elections although individual circumstance may vary. Voting patterns have shown that most voters stay with their chosen party within a limited percentage range based on local issues and circumstances. The main advantage in Victoria's case is that both systems are similar in design with one being a subset of the other. Victoria held its first multi-member proportional representation (STV) election in November 2006 for the Legislative Council.

== District size ==
Another issue commonly considered with STV elections is the size of the voting districts in terms of the number of candidates elected (district magnitude) and, to a lesser extent, the total size of the body being elected.

Because STV is proportional, larger districts reduce the support a candidate knows will be enough to become elected as a percentage of the district vote. The usual choice is the Droop quota. With 9 to be elected, for example, any who reach (with or without transfers) 10% electoral support will win a seat, whereas with 5 to be elected 16.7% is enough to ensure success.

Some STV elections make use of districts with the number of seats available as small as two or three. An STV election for a district with only two seats will result in a largely unchanging result of each seat going to the most popular and second most popular party so long as neither party falls below a quota of 33.3% of the vote - similar results to the (non STV) Binomial System in Chile. This can also be observed in Australian Senate representation for the Northern Territory; where the territory's two senators have been divided by the two major parties, bipartisan but uncompetitive representation by design

A larger number of candidates elected also results in a smaller number of wasted votes on the final count. However, larger districts and the implicit larger number of candidates also increase the difficulty of giving meaningful rankings to all candidates from the perspective of the individual voter, and may result in increased numbers of exhausted ballots and reliance on party labels or group voting tickets (although not all STV systems require voters to rank all candidates but only ask them to rank as many as the voter wants to).

While Ireland originally had a median district magnitude of five (range three to nine) in 1923, successive governments lowered this. A parliamentary committee in 2010 discussed the "increasing trend towards the creation of three-seat constituencies in Ireland." They found "a larger district magnitude is shown to have positive effects in relation to the representation of women and minorities, as well as allowing for a plurality of ideas in terms of policy." They recommended not less than four-seaters, except where the geographic size of such a constituency would be disproportionately large. (Although the large number of representatives in Irish legislative chambers and the small size of the island even as a whole makes the term "large" a relative thing.)

When Northern Ireland adopted STV, they found five-seaters not sufficiently proportional and chose six-seaters.

Tasmania had seven-seaters until the Green Party won the balance of power in 1996, after which the two large parties shrank the district magnitude to five and called an early election, which cut the Green representation from four seats down to one.

Larger electoral districts can also significantly reduce the effects of gerrymandering; because gerrymandering is splitting of voters into separate contests, fewer and larger multi-member districts, which are integral part of STV, mitigate this. As well, if all are represented proportionally in each district, shifting of boundaries makes little difference.

It is noticed that gerrymandering relies on wasted votes to award the "last seat" in each district, so proportional representation systems such as STV with larger multi-member districts are intrinsically more difficult to gerrymander.

Larger districts can also make for significantly harder tactical voting: since the problem of making correct assumptions about other voter's behavior and rearranging one's tactical ballot is NP-hard, the difficulty of tactical voting increases sharply as the number of candidates grows.

There is no theoretical upper limit to the size of districts in STV, and they may not even be needed at all: Thomas Hare's original proposal was for a single, nationwide district. In theory, STV ensures the election of particularly small minorities provided they secure a quota's worth of votes, if very large districts were used.

The 1925 Irish Senate election used one district to elect nineteen places and the Cork Corporation used a single 21-seat local electoral area until subdivided in time for the 1967 local election.

Perhaps the STV governmental election electing the most members ever were the New South Wales Legislative Council elections, held from 1991 to the present. Held state-wide, it elected 21 members in one single contest - 4.7M votes were cast in 2019.

A related question is the number of people (voters) in the district, and the possibility of an effective democratic campaign by a candidate in a large district where campaign costs are high. In Northern Ireland, districts range from 96,000 people in six-seaters for the Northern Ireland Assembly, and even smaller districts municipally, to a single three-seater district of all 1,737,000 people for election to the European Parliament. In State of Victoria (Australia) 40 members are elected for the Legislative Council, five per district through STV, with 3.1M votes cast in 2006. With 360,000 to 375,000 votes cast in each district. Previous to PR being adopted, the Legislative Council held 44 members, with half elected each two years.

== Tactical voting ==
According to Gibbard's theorem tactical voting is possible in all non-dictatorial deterministic voting systems that choose a single winner, and the Duggan-Schwartz theorem shows that most ranked methods electing multiple winners also fail to be strategyproof. A number of methods of tactical or strategic voting exist that can be used in elections conducted using STV. In general these methods are only effective in marginal districts and only affect the allocation of a single seat per district.

One potential strategy in STV involves casting a first preference vote for a candidate that has no chance of winning. This vote will then be transferred at full value and carry more weight in determining the winners at the later stages of the count. This strategy can be effective due to two features of some STV counting systems.

1. Simple Gregorian transfer (SGT) systems such as ERS97 and Newland-Britton Northern Ireland consider for transfer only the last parcel of votes received by an elected candidate.
2. Both simple Gregorian transfer systems and weighted inclusive Gregorian transfer (WIGT) systems such as BC-STV do not transfer votes to already elected candidates.

For example, in an election in which 5 candidates are contesting 3 seats the following 400 votes are cast:

105: A > D > B
90: B
80: C > B
75: D > B
50: E > A > C > D

The quota is 100 and A is elected at stage 1. E is the first candidate to be eliminated. Under SGT, the 50 E > A > C > D votes "skip" candidate A and transfer to candidate C; who is then elected. These votes then transfer again to candidate D who wins the final seat. The SGT winners are A, C and D.

Under WIGT, the 50 E > A > C > D votes again "skip" candidate A and transfer to C who wins the second seat. All C's votes (both the E > A > C > D votes and the C > B votes) then transfer at reduced value. As a result of this transfer candidate B wins the third seat. The WIGT winners are A, C and B.

The Meek system, which is immune to this strategy, elects A, B and D.

Under SGT, the E > A > C > D voters effectively determine the winners of the two final seats. Under WIGT, as a result of the E > A > C > D votes failing to contribute to the election of candidate A and transferring at an increased value, C wins a seat as opposed to D. SGT systems are more vulnerable to this form of tactical voting than WIGT systems.

While this appears an effective strategy in theory there are a number of problems with it in practice. Firstly accurate information is needed about how other voters are going to vote, in practice this information is difficult to obtain. Secondly if all voters vote for candidates they believe will lose, these candidates will win. In general, this strategy will not work if everyone uses it. Little evidence exists of the use of this strategy in the real world.

== Uniqueness of votes ==
If there are a large number of candidates, which is quite common in single transferable vote elections, then it is likely that many preference voting patterns will be unique to individual voters, which could allow voters to identify themselves in a context of corruption or intimidation, with transparency of vote counting undermining the secrecy of ballots. For example, in the 2002 Irish general election, the electronic votes were published for the Dublin North constituency. There were 12 candidates and almost 44,000 votes cast. The most common pattern (for the three candidates from one party in a particular order) was chosen by only 800 voters, and more than 16,000 patterns were chosen by just one voter each. The number of possible complete rankings with no ties is the factorial of the number of candidates, so almost half a billion possibilities if there are 12 candidates; but if voters can stop expressing preferences then over 1.3 billion possibilities with 12 candidates.

== Voting system criteria ==
Academic analysis of voting systems such as STV generally centers on the voting system criteria that they pass. No preference voting system satisfies all the criteria described in Arrow's impossibility theorem: in particular, STV fails to achieve independence of irrelevant alternatives (like most other vote-based ordering systems) as well as monotonicity. Failure to satisfy independence of irrelevant alternatives makes STV slightly prone to strategic nomination, albeit less so than with plurality methods where the spoiler effect is more pronounced and predictable. Non-monotonicity, in turn, makes it possible under some circumstances to elect a preferred candidate by reducing their position on some of the ballots; by helping elect a candidate who displaces the preferred candidate's main rival, a voter may cause the preferred candidate to profit from transfers resulting from the rival's defeat. STV fails the participation criterion which can result in a more favorable outcome to an STV voter by not voting at all. However, a voter who truncates a candidate off the ballot does not harm a ranked candidate, nor is another truncated candidate helped on the ballot.

STV is also susceptible to the Alabama paradox: a candidate elected in an n seat constituency may or may not be elected in the same constituency with n + 1 seats even when voters express exactly the same preferences. This is due to the use of quotas; list PR by a largest remainder method is similarly affected, though a highest averages method is not. Intuitively, a candidate who was elected largely because of transfers from two similar groups (neither obtaining a quota) may not be elected when the number of winning candidates increases, as both groups would instead get their preferred candidates elected (with the new, smaller quota) rather than automatically compromising on their mutual second choice as their votes transfer.

Some modifications to STV have been proposed in order to pass monotonicity and other criteria. The most common method of proposed modification to STV is to alter the order in which candidates are eliminated: theoretically, a candidate who ranked second on every ballot could be the first candidate eliminated even if they are a Condorcet winner. Meek noted this problem in proposing their variation of transferring votes to nearly eliminate tactical voting in STV, however Meek himself did not propose a method for satisfying the Condorcet criterion. Other theorists have proposed further refinements of STV, such as using a Condorcet method to rank candidates for elimination order. Some of these modifications alter STV in a way such that it no longer reduces to instant-runoff voting when applied to a single seat but instead reduces to some other single winner system, such as a Condorcet method. CPO-STV is one example of multiple winner ranked voting method which satisfies the Condorcet criterion.

Eliminating losing candidates in reverse order of their Borda count, STV-B, affects some issues of STV. Borda counts include deeper preferences, and so contain more information than is held in current first place votes. Borda counts would capture the popularity of that Condorcet winner described in the preceding paragraph, preventing immediate elimination. Elimination by Borda counts creates other features for STV including promotion of moderate candidates and increased stability in the face of small changes of preferences.

== Vacancies ==
When compared with other voting methods, the question of how to fill vacancies which occur under STV can be difficult given the way that results depend upon transfers from multiple candidates. As well by-elections to fill a single seat in a multi-member district can be expensive.

=== Appointment ===
Another option is to have a head official or remaining members of the elected body appoint a new member to fulfill the vacancy. In Australia, for example, the state legislatures appoint replacements members to the Australian Senate, now done at the suggestion of the party of the outgoing senator. Before this rule, disputes over Senate vacancies contributed to the Australian constitutional crisis of 1975, ultimately resulting in a 1977 amendment to the Constitution of Australia to provide that the legislature must elect a member of the same party as the outgoing senator. Vacancies in the New South Wales Legislative Council are filled similarly, by a joint sitting of both the legislative council and assembly.

In the Republic of Ireland and Northern Ireland, vacancies on local authorities are filled by co-option of a candidate nominated by the departed councillor's party colleagues, although in Northern Ireland this requires unanimous approval from the council.

=== By-election ===
A third alternative to fulfill a vacancy is to hold a single-winner by-election (effectively instant-runoff unless there is more than one vacancy); this allows each party to choose a new candidate and all voters to participate. This often leads to a different party winning the seat (usually one of the largest parties, since the quota is large). In the Republic of Ireland, by-elections are used for the Dáil and for the Seanad where voters in the Dáil constituency or Seanad panel vote to fill the vacancy or vacancies. This removes the balance of proportionality of the original election. The costs of holding a by-election in a multi-member constituency is considerable. In a recent review of the City of Melbourne, in Australia, the cost of holding a by-election for a single casual vacancy was estimated to surpass $1 million.

=== Replacement list ===
Another alternative is to have the candidates themselves create an ordered list of successors before leaving their seat. In the European Parliament, a departing Republic of Ireland or Northern Ireland member is replaced with the top eligible name from a replacement list submitted by the candidate at the time of the original election.

== See also ==
- CPO-STV
- Quota Borda system
- Schulze STV
