= Casual vacancy =

Situation in which a seat in a deliberative assembly becomes vacant

In politics, a casual vacancy (casual in the sense of "by chance") is a situation in which a seat in a deliberative assembly becomes vacant during that assembly's term. Casual vacancies may arise through the death, resignation or disqualification of the sitting member, or for other reasons.

Casual vacancies have the effect of eliminating or reducing the representation for the member's constituency. Accordingly, many jurisdictions provide by law for the speedy filling of vacant seats.

Casual vacancies can also occur in non-governmental assemblies, such as boards of directors and committees of voluntary organisations.

Methods of filling a casual vacancy to an elected body include:

- by-election or special election, of the same electorate which voted in the vacating member
- co-option, by the remaining members of the body
- appointment or nomination, by a different body or office holder
- automatic succession, of a substitute or from a replacement list, fixed at the time of the original election
- countback, used in single transferable vote elections: recounting the ballots of the original election and redistributing those allocated to the vacating member....

== Australia ==
The method used to fill casual vacancies varies between jurisdictions.

On the federal level, casual vacancies in the Australian House of Representatives are filled using by-elections. Casual vacancies for the Australian Senate are required to be filled by someone of the same party as the departing senator, and a joint sitting of the departing senator's state/territory parliament decides the person who will fill the vacancy.

Casual vacancies in the Tasmanian House of Assembly, Australian Capital Territory Legislative Assembly and Western Australian Legislative Council are filled by countbacks. Casual vacancies in the Tasmanian Legislative Council, Queensland Legislative Assembly, Western Australian Legislative Assembly, Victorian Legislative Assembly South Australian House of Assembly, and New South Wales Legislative Assembly are filled with by-elections. Casual vacancies in the New South Wales Legislative Council, South Australian Legislative Council and Victorian Legislative Council. are filled by election in a joint sitting of both chambers of the respective state parliament; the elected member must be from the same party as the previous member at the time of the previous member's election (or an independent, if the previous member was elected as an independent).

== Canada ==
Vacancies in the House of Commons of Canada are filled by the scheduling of a by-election in the affected district. The writ for a by-election must be 'dropped' (issued) no sooner than 11 days and no later than 180 days after the Chief Electoral Officer is officially notified of a vacancy via a warrant issued by the Speaker. Under the Canada Elections Act, the minimum length of a campaign is 36 days between dropping the writ and election day. A seat can, in some cases, be vacant for even longer; prior to the 2015 federal election, for example, Stephen Harper had to call three by-elections in 2015. However, as the length of time the seats were vacant required that a byelection be called but the length of time remaining before the general election campaign began was too short to justify actually holding one, he scheduled the by-election dates as the date of the general election itself — a technical formality which essentially meant that a by-election was scheduled but would never actually be held. The by-elections were superseded by the general election at the dissolution of parliament on August 2, 2015 and the dropping of the federal election writ.

As the Senate of Canada is an appointed rather than elected body, vacancies in that body are simply filled with a new appointment.

By-elections are also held to fill vacancies in Canada's provincial or territorial legislatures.

== India ==
Section 151A of the Representation of the People Act, 1951 mandates the Election Commission to fill the casual vacancies in the Parliament of India and State Legislatures through by-elections within six months from the date of occurrence of the vacancy, provided that the remainder of the term of a member in relation to a vacancy is one year or more.

== Singapore ==
A by-election is usually called when an incumbent member of the Parliament of Singapore vacates his or her seat in a SMC or when all MPs vacates their seat together in a GRC.

In a recent case according to then Minister in the Prime Minister's Office Chan Chun Sing, a by-election need not be called if a GRC MP resigns or is incapacitated in any way. The reason is the GRC scheme is meant to achieve two purposes: Ensure there are enough minority members in the House and ensure no political campaigning is done on issues of race and religion. These goals would not be affected if one member of the GRC left, Mr Chan added. However it did not cater for instances where the minority race MP vacates their seat hence the SDP filed a suit to clarify the matter. The High Court judge rejected the bid to hold a by-election and SDP withdraws the suit after a thorough explanation by the Deputy AG.

== New Zealand ==
Since 2020, the New Zealand House of Representatives has 72 seats whose members represent geographical constituencies, and at least a further 48 seats selected from party lists. A vacancy in any of the 72 "electorate seats" is filled through a by-election. The writ for the by-election must, in most circumstances, be issued within 21 days of the notification of the vacancy. A by-election is not required if Parliament's three-year term is due to expire within six months.

"List seats" supplement electorate seats for proportional representation following a general election. However, if an electorate seat changes parties after a by-election, it disrupts Parliament's proportionality. By contrast, a vacancy in a list seat is filled by the next available candidate on the list submitted by the party entitled to that seat, so proportionality is unaffected.

== United States ==
The term "casual vacancy" is not commonly used in the United States. A vacancy in the United States House of Representatives is filled by a special election. The Constitution requires the executive authority (i.e. the governor) of the state concerned to issue writs of election.

The seventeenth amendment provides that vacancies in the United States Senate be filled by an appointment by the governor unless the legislature of the state concerned has passed a law providing some other means to fill the vacancy, such as a popular election.
