= Nicolaus Tideman =

American economist and political scientist (born 1943)

Thorwald Nicolaus Tideman (/ˈtiːdɪmən/, not /ˈtaɪdmən/; born August 11, 1943, in Chicago, Illinois) is a Georgist economist and professor at Virginia Tech. He received his Bachelor of Arts in economics and mathematics from Reed College in 1965 and his PhD in economics from the University of Chicago in 1969. Tideman was an assistant professor of economics at Harvard University from 1969 to 1973, during which time from 1970 to 1971 he was a Senior Staff Economist for the President's Council of Economic Advisors. Since 1973, he has been at Virginia Tech, with various visiting positions at Harvard Kennedy School (1979–1980), University of Buckingham (1985–1986), and the American Institute for Economic Research (1999–2000).

== Research ==
Tideman's academic interests include taxation of land, voting theory, and political philosophy.

=== Ranked Pairs ===
In 1987, he devised the voting system called "ranked pairs" (or the "Tideman method" or simply "RP"), which is a type of Condorcet method. It selects a single winner using votes that express a preference ranking. Ranked pairs can also be used to create a sorted list of winners.

=== Other research ===
In 2000, Tideman developed the CPO-STV proportional voting method. Tideman also devised the independence of clones criterion which both of his methods satisfy. He is an associate of the Earth Rights Institute. His book Collective Decisions and Voting: The Potential for Public Choice was published by Ashgate Publishing in November 2006.
