= Schulze STV =

Proportional-representation ranked voting system

Schulze STV is a multi-winner ranked voting system designed to achieve proportional representation. It was invented by Markus Schulze, who developed the Schulze method for resolving ties using a Condorcet method. Schulze STV is similar to CPO-STV in that it compares possible winning candidate pairs and selects the Condorcet winner. It is named in analogy to the single transferable vote (STV), but only shares its aim of proportional representation, and is otherwise based on unrelated principles.

The system is based on Schulze's investigations into vote management and free riding. When a voter prefers a popular candidate, there is an advantage to first choosing a candidate who is unlikely to win ("Woodall free riding") or omitting his preferred candidate from his rankings ("Hylland free riding"). Schulze STV is designed to be as resistant to free riding as possible, without giving up the Droop proportionality criterion.

== Example ==
Imagine an election in which there are two seats to be filled, and three candidates are competing for election: Andrea and Carter of the Yellow Party, and Brad of the Purple Party.

There are 90 voters, and each voter ranks the candidates in their order of preference. Their preferences are shown below.

Andrea's Supporters
Yellow Party Supporters
Purple Party Supporters
12
26
12
13
27
1. Andrea (Y)
2. Brad (P)
3. Carter (Y)
1. Andrea (Y)
2. Carter (Y)
3. Brad (P)
1. Andrea (Y)
2. Carter (Y)
3. Brad (P)
1. Carter (Y)
2. Andrea (Y)
3. Brad (P)
1. Brad (P)

The initial tallies are:

- Andrea (Y): 50
- Carter (Y): 13
- Brad (P): 27

There are three possible outcomes (or sets of winners) in the election:

- A. Andrea and Carter.
- B. Andrea and Brad.
- C. Carter and Brad.

Under Schulze STV, it is certain that any candidate with more than the Droop quota of first preferences will be elected. The quota is determined according to $({\rm \mbox{valid votes cast}}) / ({\rm \mbox{seats to fill}}+1) = 90 / (2 + 1) = 30.$ This means that Andrea is certain to be elected, and thus there are only two possible outcomes:

- A. Andrea and Carter.
- B. Andrea and Brad.

These two outcomes must be compared.

=== Comparison of A and B ===
First, we test support for (Andrea, Carter) beating (Andrea, Brad*), where Brad is the test candidate.

- $12$ prefer Andrea (but not Carter) to Brad → assign $12$ to Andrea
- $0$ prefer Carter (but not Andrea) to Brad
- $51$ prefer both Andrea and Carter to Brad → assign $19.5$ to Andrea and $31.5$ to Carter
- $27$ prefer Brad to both Andrea and Carter → these remain unassigned
- Andrea and Carter end the test with $31.5$

The 51 votes that prefer both Andrea and Carter to Brad were assigned such that both Andrea and Carter will have the same number of votes after their assignment. This is done so that the lower of the two is maximised.

Next, we test support for (Andrea, Brad) beating (Andrea, Carter*), where Carter is now the test candidate.

- $38$ prefer Andrea (but not Brad) to Carter → assign $38$ to Andrea
- $27$ prefer Brad (but not Andrea) to Carter → assign $27$ to Brad
- $12$ prefer both Andrea and Brad to Carter → assign $0.5$ to Andrea and $11.5$ to Brad
- $13$ prefer Carter to both Andrea and Brad → these remain unassigned
- Andrea and Brad end the test with $38.5$

At the end of the comparison, (Andrea, Brad) beats (Andrea, Carter) with a score of 38.5 votes to 31.5 votes.

=== Result ===
Since (Andrea, Brad) beats (Andrea, Carter), (Andrea, Brad) is the Condorcet winner, and both Andrea and Brad are elected. This is the same result as standard PR-STV.

=== Resistance to vote management ===
In vote management, a party instructs its voters not to rank a popular party candidate first. If the Yellow Party's leaders instruct their supporters to choose Carter first (followed by Andrea), the balloting changes. Unlike STV, however, Schulze STV resists vote management.

== Potential for tactical voting ==
Proportional representation systems are much less susceptible to tactical voting than single-winner systems such as the first past the post system and instant-runoff voting (IRV), if the number of seats to be filled is sufficiently large. Schulze STV aims to have additional resistance to forms of tactical voting which are specific to single transferable voting methods, in particular a phenomenon that Schulze calls Hylland Free Riding. STV methods which make use of Meek's or Warren's method are resistant to what Schulze calls Woodall Free Riding, but are still vulnerable to Hylland Free Riding.

As Schulze STV reduces to the Schulze method in single winner elections, it fails the participation criterion, the later-no-harm criterion and the later-no-help criterion, whereas traditional forms of STV (that reduce to IRV in single winner elections) fulfill later-no-help and later-no-harm.

== Complexity ==
Schulze STV is no more complicated for the voter than other forms of STV; the ballot is the same, and candidates are ranked in order of preference. In calculating an election result, however, Schulze STV is significantly more complex than STV. In most applications, computer calculation would be required. The algorithm implementing Schulze STV requires exponentially many steps in the number of seats to be filled (roughly on the order of $m^{3k}$ steps when k out of m candidates are to be selected), making the computation difficult if this number is not very small. In particular, the rule does not have polynomial runtime.

Compared to CPO-STV, implementing Schulze STV might be somewhat faster, since it only compares outcomes differing by one candidate; CPO-STV compares all possible pairs.
