= CPO-STV =

Proportional-representation ranked voting system

CPO-STV, or the Comparison of Pairs of Outcomes by the Single Transferable Vote, is a ranked voting system designed to achieve proportional representation. It is a more sophisticated variant of the Single Transferable Vote (STV) system, designed to overcome some of the system's perceived shortcomings. It does this by incorporating features of the Condorcet method, a voting system designed for single-winner elections, into STV. As in other forms of STV, in a CPO-STV election, more than one candidate is elected and voters must rank candidates in order of preference. As of February 2021, it has not been used for a public election.

CPO-STV aims to overcome the problems of tactical voting in traditional forms of STV, where a candidate can be eliminated at an early stage in the process that might have gone on to be elected later had they been allowed to remain in the contest. CPO-STV works by comparing the possible outcomes of an election, to determine which outcome best matches the preferences of voters. If used for a single-winner election, CPO-STV becomes the same as Condorcet voting, in the same way that traditional STV becomes instant-runoff voting (IRV). The system was invented by Nicolaus Tideman.

== Voting ==
Each voter ranks the candidates in order of preference. For example:

1. Andrea
2. Brad
3. Carter
4. Delilah
5. Eric

The rules for a CPO-STV election will determine whether or not a voter must rank every single candidate, and whether or not they are permitted to give the same ranking to more than one candidate.

== Procedure ==
=== Setting the quota ===
The Hare, Droop, or any quota in between may be used for a CPO-STV election. Tideman recommends the Hagenbach-Bischoff quota (also known as the "exact Droop quota"), given by:

$$\rm votes \over \rm {seats+1}$$

=== Finding the winners ===
CPO-STV compares every possible outcome of an election to every other possible outcome to find the set of winners with the highest level of support, which is a variation of the Condorcet method. Usually, there is an outcome that wins every such contest, and it is this set of candidates who are elected.

When two outcomes are compared, a special method is used to give each a score and so determine which is the winner. When comparing two outcomes, the steps are as follows:

1. Eliminate candidates in neither outcome: All candidates who are not present in either outcome are excluded, and the votes for them are transferred. Any voter who supports an excluded candidate has their vote transferred to their next most preferred candidate, who is present in at least one of the two outcomes.
2. Transfer surpluses of candidates in both outcomes: Where the number of votes for a candidate is greater than the quota, the surplus above the quota is transferred. However, only the surpluses of candidates present in both outcomes are transferred; any other surpluses are not transferred. The surplus votes may only be transferred to candidates who are present in at least one of the two outcomes.
3. Add up the totals: After all necessary exclusions and transfers have occurred, the total number of votes deemed to have been cast for the candidates in a given outcome are added up, and the result is considered the score for that outcome.
4. Declare the winner: The outcome with the higher score is deemed the winner of that particular comparison.

Occasionally, once every possible outcome has been compared against every other outcome, there will be no one outcome that beats all others—that is, there is no clear 'Condorcet winner'. In such cases, a more complicated procedure, known as a Condorcet completion method, must be used to determine the set of winners that are elected. The completion method depends on the version of Condorcet's method being used. Versions of Condorcet's method with different, sophisticated completion methods include Ranked Pairs (also developed by Tideman) and the Schulze method.

=== Surplus transfer methods ===
Traditional forms of STV differ in how they deal with the transfer of surplus votes. Older forms of STV transfer surplus votes in the form of whole votes—either in a random system of transfers (Hare's method), by reference to the next usable preference (as used in Ireland and Malta) —or a system of fractional transfers of all votes held by an elected candidate (the Gregory method). These methods are quite crude and can encourage tactical voting. Warren's method and Meek's method are more sophisticated transfer methods. CPO-STV is compatible with all of these methods, so it is up to those responsible for choosing the voting system to decide which particular method they wish to use.

== Example ==
The following example shows a single election held first under traditional STV and then under CPO-STV in order to illustrate the differences between CPO-STV and older forms of STV. The Hagenbach-Bischoff quota is used in both cases. This is 25 in the scenario given.

=== Scenario ===
Imagine an election in which there are three seats to be filled, and five candidates are competing for election: Andrea, Brad, Carter, Delilah and Eric. There are 100 voters and their preferences are shown below.

25 voters

1. Andrea

34 voters

1. Carter
2. Brad
3. Delilah

7 voters

1. Brad
2. Delilah

8 voters

1. Delilah
2. Brad

5 voters

1. Delilah
2. Eric

21 voters

1. Eric
2. Delilah

=== Count under traditional STV ===
1. The initial tallies are:

- Andrea: 25
- Brad: 7
- Carter: 34
- Delilah: 13
- Eric: 21

2. Andrea and Carter are immediately declared elected. Carter's surplus is transferred so that the tallies become:

- Brad: 16
- Delilah: 13
- Eric: 21

3. Delilah has the fewest votes and is eliminated. Her votes are transferred and the tallies become:

- Brad: 24
- Eric: 26

4. Eric has reached the quota and is declared elected.

==== Result ====
The elected candidates are Andrea, Carter and Eric.

=== Count under CPO-STV ===
There are ten possible outcomes (or sets of winners) in the election:

- A. Andrea, Carter, Delilah.
- B. Andrea, Carter, Eric.
- C. Andrea, Carter, Brad.
- D. Andrea, Brad, Delilah.
- E. Andrea, Brad, Eric.
- F. Andrea, Delilah, Eric.
- G. Carter, Brad, Delilah.
- H. Carter, Brad, Eric.
- I. Carter, Delilah, Eric.
- J. Brad, Delilah, Eric.

Under CPO-STV, it is certain that any candidate with more than the quota in first preferences will be elected. Andrea and Carter have both reached the quota to begin with so, for the sake of simplicity, this example need show only the comparison of those outcomes which include both of these candidates as winners. The list of possible outcomes may therefore be reduced to three:

- Outcome A: Andrea, Carter, Delilah.
- Outcome B: Andrea, Carter, Eric.
- Outcome C: Andrea, Carter, Brad.

Each of these outcomes will be compared, in turn, with each other outcome, in order to find a winner. Three comparisons are therefore necessary. A fourth comparison will also be demonstrated, that between Outcome A and Outcome D. We know that Outcome D cannot win but this will be done in order to completely clarify CPO-STV's rule for when and when not to transfer surpluses.

- Outcome D: Andrea, Brad, Delilah.

==== Comparison of A and B ====
The first preferences cast for all of the candidates are as follows:

- Andrea: 25
- Brad: 7
- Carter: 34
- Delilah: 13
- Eric: 21

Brad does not appear in either Outcome A or Outcome B so he is excluded from the comparison. His votes all transfer to Delilah so that the tallies stand at:

- Andrea: 25
- Carter: 34
- Delilah: 20
- Eric: 21

Carter has more than the quota and is present in both outcomes. Therefore, his surplus is transferred. It goes to Delilah, so the tallies become:

- Andrea: 25
- Carter: 25
- Delilah: 29
- Eric: 21

When compared, the total scores for Outcomes A and B are therefore:

Candidate	Outcome A	Outcome B
Andrea	25	25
Carter	25	25
Delilah	29	-
Eric	-	21
Total	79	71

Outcome A therefore beats Outcome B.

==== Comparison of B and C ====
The candidates present in at least one outcome are Andrea, Carter, Brad and Eric. Delilah is therefore excluded. Eight of her votes transfer to Brad and five to Eric. Carter's surplus is then transferred and goes to Brad. The final scores are therefore as follows:

Candidate	Outcome B	Outcome C
Andrea	25	25
Brad	-	24
Carter	25	25
Eric	26	-
Total	76	74

Outcome B therefore beats Outcome C.

==== Comparison of A and C ====
The candidates present in either outcome are Andrea, Carter, Delilah and Brad. Eric is therefore excluded and his votes transfer to Delilah. Carter's surplus is then transferred and goes to Brad. The final scores are therefore as follows:

Candidate	Outcome A	Outcome C
Andrea	25	25
Brad	-	16
Carter	25	25
Delilah	34	-
Total	84	66

Outcome A therefore beats Outcome C.

==== Comparison of A and D ====
The candidates present in at least one outcome are Andrea, Carter, Brad and Delilah. Once Eric is excluded and his votes transferred to Delilah the tallies are:

- Andrea: 25
- Carter: 34
- Brad: 7
- Delilah: 34

Carter has more than the quota. However, in this case he is not present in both outcomes so his surplus is not transferred. The final scores are therefore:

Candidate	Outcome A	Outcome D
Andrea	25	25
Brad	-	7
Carter	34	-
Delilah	34	34
Total	93	66

Outcome A therefore beats Outcome D.

==== Result ====
As shown above, Outcome A beats both Outcome B and Outcome C. We have also said that because Andrea and Carter both have at least a quota of votes to begin with we can be certain that Outcome A can also beat any other possible outcome it is compared to. Because Outcome A beats every other possible outcome it is declared the winner. The elected candidates are therefore: Andrea, Carter and Delilah.

The results of the election can also be illustrated in the form of a Condorcet-style matrix. This matrix includes only the comparisons between Outcomes A, B, and C:

	Outcome A	Outcome B	Outcome C
Outcome A		[B] 71 [A] 79	[C] 66 [A] 84
Outcome B	[A] 79 [B] 71		[C] 74 [B] 76
Outcome C	[A] 84 [C] 66	[B] 76 [C] 74	

== Comparison between CPO-STV and traditional STV ==
The example above clearly illustrates the difference between CPO-STV and traditional forms of STV. Where CPO-STV resulted in the election of Andrea, Carter and Delilah, the same election held under the rules of traditional STV would have resulted in the election of Andrea, Carter and Eric. The differences between CPO-STV and traditional STV are analogous to those between Condorcet's method and instant-runoff voting.

The reason Delilah does not win under traditional STV arises from the particular stage at which she is eliminated from the count. Because she is eliminated at this point, she cannot benefit from any transfers she might have received at a later stage. In traditional STV, the order in which candidates are eliminated during the count is highly influential in determining the final result. Advocates of CPO-STV argue that the sequence in which candidates happen to be eliminated in an election is in fact highly arbitrary and should not influence the result. It was in order to resolve this problem of sequential exclusions that CPO-STV was designed.

The actual effect of sequential exclusions is that the number of first or other preferences a candidate receives is very important. For example, where a candidate has very few first preferences but is rated second or third by a great many voters it will be difficult for them to be elected. This is because they are likely to be eliminated before any of these later preferences can be transferred to them. Traditional STV, it is therefore argued, is unfair to compromise candidates, who are likely to have few first preferences but many later preferences. Other proposed electoral systems that attempt to remove the problem of sequential exclusions from STV are Schulze STV and Sequential STV.

== Effects ==
=== Potential for tactical voting ===
Because, like all other forms of STV, CPO-STV is a system of proportional representation, it creates far less potential for tactical voting than do single-winner systems such as the first-past-the-post system and instant-runoff voting.

However, all forms of STV are vulnerable to some degree of tactical voting because they lack monotonicity. This means that it is sometimes possible to benefit a candidate by ranking them lower than one's true order of preference, or to harm a candidate by ranking them higher. While CPO-STV does not eliminate the problem of monotonicity relating to STV it greatly reduces it, by creating fewer situations in which it would be possible for a voter to affect the outcome in this way.

One particular strategy under STV relates to the method used for the transfer of surpluses. Under some, older forms of STV it is possible to increase the influence of one's vote by giving a first, or other early preference to a candidate one knows is highly unlikely to win. This tactic is sometimes known as 'raising a turkey'. However this problem is eliminated if one uses more sophisticated transfer methods like Warren's method or Meek's method. CPO-STV is compatible with both of these methods.

=== Impact on candidates and factions ===
Like all forms of proportional representation CPO-STV is likely to elect councils or assemblies in which no one party or faction has an absolute majority. Like other forms of STV its use of preferential voting is likely to encourage candidates to appeal to a broad cross section of voters in order to garner later preferences. This characteristic might, however, be increased by the fact that later preferences have a greater influence on the final result under CPO-STV than under traditional forms of STV. All forms of STV tend to force the candidates of a single party to compete against each other. This is said to increase voter choice but is also sometimes accused of producing candidates who are more clientelist and parochial.

=== Practical implications ===
From the point of view of the voter, CPO-STV is not more complicated than traditional forms of STV. Under both systems the ballot paper is the same and voting occurs by ranking the candidates in order of preference.

However, with respect to calculating an election result, CPO-STV is significantly more complex. A hand count, therefore, is only likely to be feasible in simple elections with a small number of candidates and voters. For large scale elections it is necessary for the results to be calculated by computer.

Finding the result of a CPO-STV election involves producing results, one at a time, for every possible pair of every possible set of winning candidates. It is therefore a task that increases dramatically in difficulty as the number of candidates does. There are, however, certain shortcuts that can be taken that will reduce the length of a count while producing the same result. We have already seen, for example, that where a candidate has at least a quota of first preferences it is not necessary to consider any outcome in which they are not present as a winner.

== See also ==
- Counting single transferable votes
