= Condorcet method =

Pairwise-comparison electoral system

Example Condorcet method voting ballot. Blank votes are equivalent to ranking that candidate last.

The Condorcet or majority-rule methods (English: /kɒndɔːrˈseɪ/; French: [kɔ̃dɔʁsɛ]) are a family of election systems that elect the majority-preferred (Condorcet) winner if one exists. A majority-preferred candidate is a candidate who would win a majority of votes in any head-to-head election against any opponent. In other words, they are a candidate who would win in any one-on-one race (one without spoilers). The head-to-head elections need not be done separately; a voter's choice within any given pair can be determined from the ranking.

Some elections may not have a Condorcet winner because the majority's preferences can be cyclic: in other words, it is possible every candidate has an opponent that would defeat them in a two-candidate contest. This is similar to a game of rock, paper, scissors: a candidate "scissors" may beat "paper," but still lose to "rock". The possibility of such a cycle is known as Condorcet's paradox. (Empirically, however, such cycles are rare, with most large public elections having a Condorcet winner. As a result, all Condorcet methods reduce to simple majority rule in most cases.)

Under many models of voting, the Condorcet winner is typically the same as the socially optimal winner. However, this is not guaranteed to be the case; situations where the two disagree are commonly called tyranny of the majority scenarios (particularly if the disagreement is large).

Condorcet voting methods are named for the 18th-century French mathematician, the Marquis de Condorcet, who popularized the concept. Condorcet methods were first extensively analyzed by Ramon Llull, but the manuscripts of these works were lost from the Late Middle Ages until being rediscovered in the 20th century.

Condorcet methods are commonly used to vote on motions and amendments in assemblies and legislatures, as they allow replacing paper ballots with a series of simple majority votes, with prominent parliamentary procedure handbooks such as Jefferson's Manual and Robert's Rules of Order prescribing their use. However, public elections typically use ranked ballots to avoid the time and complexity of a full round-robin tournament with each voter's choice in a paired matchup being determined by checking which candidate has the higher rank or rating on a ballot.

== Overview ==
In a contest between candidates A, B and C using the preferential-vote form of Condorcet method, a head-to-head race is conducted between each pair of candidates. A and B, B and C, and C and A. If one candidate is preferred over all others, they are the Condorcet Winner and winner of the election.

Because of the possibility of the Condorcet paradox, it is possible (but empirically rare) that a Condorcet winner does not exist in a specific election. This is sometimes called a Condorcet cycle or just cycle and can be thought of as Rock beating Scissors, Scissors beating Paper, and Paper beating Rock. Various Condorcet methods differ in how they resolve such a cycle. (Most elections do not have cycles. See Condorcet paradox#Likelihood for estimates.) If there is no cycle, all Condorcet methods elect the same candidate and are operationally equivalent.

- Each voter ranks the candidates in order of preference (top-to-bottom, or best-to-worst, or 1st, 2nd, 3rd, etc.). The voter may be allowed to rank candidates as equals and to express indifference (no preference) between them. Candidates omitted by a voter may be treated as if the voter ranked them at the bottom.
- For each pairing of candidates (as in a round-robin tournament) count how many votes rank each candidate over the other candidate. Thus each pairing will have two totals: the size of its majority and the size of its minority (or there will be a tie).

For most Condorcet methods, those counts usually suffice to determine the complete order of finish (i.e. who won, who came in 2nd place, etc.). They always suffice to determine whether there is a Condorcet winner.

Additional information may be needed in the event of ties. Ties can be pairings that have no majority, or they can be majorities that are the same size. Such ties will be rare when there are many voters. Some Condorcet methods may have other kinds of ties. For example, with Copeland's method, it would not be rare for two or more candidates to win the same number of pairings, when there is no Condorcet winner.

== Basic procedure ==
=== Voting ===
In a Condorcet election the voter ranks the list of candidates in order of preference. If a ranked ballot is used, the voter gives a "1" to their first preference, a "2" to their second preference, and so on. Some Condorcet methods allow voters to rank more than one candidate equally so that the voter might express two first preferences rather than just one. If a scored ballot is used, voters rate or score the candidates on a scale, for example as is used in Score voting, with a higher rating indicating a greater preference. When a voter does not give a full list of preferences, it is typically assumed that they prefer the candidates that they have ranked over all the candidates that were not ranked, and that there is no preference between candidates that were left unranked.

=== Finding the winner ===
The count is conducted by pitting every candidate against every other candidate in a series of hypothetical one-on-one contests. The winner of each pairing is the candidate preferred by a majority of voters. Unless they tie, there is always a majority when there are only two choices. The candidate preferred by each voter is taken to be the one in the pair that the voter ranks (or rates) higher on their ballot paper. For example, if Alice is paired against Bob it is necessary to count both the number of voters who have ranked Alice higher than Bob, and the number who have ranked Bob higher than Alice. If Alice is preferred by more voters then she is the winner of that pairing. When all possible pairings of candidates have been considered, if one candidate beats every other candidate in these contests then they are declared the Condorcet winner. As noted above, if there is no Condorcet winner a further method must be used to find the winner of the election, and this mechanism varies from one Condorcet consistent method to another. In any Condorcet method that passes Independence of Smith-dominated alternatives, it can sometimes help to identify the Smith set from the head-to-head matchups, and eliminate all candidates not in the set before doing the procedure for that Condorcet method.

=== Pairwise counting and matrices ===
Condorcet methods use pairwise counting. For each possible pair of candidates, one pairwise count indicates how many voters prefer one of the paired candidates over the other candidate, and another pairwise count indicates how many voters have the opposite preference. The counts for all possible pairs of candidates summarize all the pairwise preferences of all the voters.

Pairwise counts are often displayed in a pairwise comparison matrix, or outranking matrix, such as those below. In these matrices, each row represents each candidate as a 'runner', while each column represents each candidate as an 'opponent'. The cells at the intersection of rows and columns each show the result of a particular pairwise comparison. Cells comparing a candidate to themselves are left blank.

Imagine there is an election between four candidates: A, B, C, and D. The first matrix below records the preferences expressed on a single ballot paper, in which the voter's preferences are (B, C, A, D); that is, the voter ranked B first, C second, A third, and D fourth. In the matrix a '1' indicates that the runner is preferred over the 'opponent', while a '0' indicates that the runner is defeated.

Opponent Runner	A	B	C	D
A	—	0	0	1
B	1	—	1	1
C	1	0	—	1
D	0	0	0	—
A '1' indicates that the runner is preferred over the opponent; a '0' indicates that the runner is defeated.

Using a matrix like the one above, one can find the overall results of an election. Each ballot can be transformed into this style of matrix, and then added to all other ballot matrices using matrix addition. The sum of all ballots in an election is called the sum matrix. Suppose that in the imaginary election there are two other voters. Their preferences are (D, A, C, B) and (A, C, B, D). Added to the first voter, these ballots would give the following sum matrix:

Opponent Runner	A	B	C	D
A	—	2	2	2
B	1	—	1	2
C	1	2	—	2
D	1	1	1	—

When the sum matrix is found, the contest between each pair of candidates is considered. The number of votes for runner over opponent (runner, opponent) is compared with the number of votes for opponent over runner (opponent, runner) to find the Condorcet winner. In the sum matrix above, A is the Condorcet winner because A beats every other candidate. When there is no Condorcet winner Condorcet completion methods, such as Ranked Pairs and the Schulze method, use the information contained in the sum matrix to choose a winner.

Cells marked '—' in the matrices above have a numerical value of '0', but a dash is used since candidates are never preferred to themselves. The first matrix, that represents a single ballot, is inversely symmetric: (runner, opponent) is ¬(opponent, runner). Or (runner, opponent) + (opponent, runner) = 1. The sum matrix has this property: (runner, opponent) + (opponent, runner) = N for N voters, if all runners were fully ranked by each voter.

== Example ==
Tennessee voting pattern

42% of voters	26% of voters	15% of voters	17% of voters
1. Memphis; 2. Nashville; 3. Chattanooga; 4. Knoxville	1. Nashville; 2. Chattanooga; 3. Knoxville; 4. Memphis	1. Chattanooga; 2. Knoxville; 3. Nashville; 4. Memphis	1. Knoxville; 2. Chattanooga; 3. Nashville; 4. Memphis

Suppose Tennessee is holding an election on the location of its capital. The population is split between four cities, and all the voters want the capital to be as close to them as possible. The options are:

- Memphis, large but far to the west
- Nashville, medium, near the center
- Chattanooga, small and in the east
- Knoxville, small and isolated

To find the Condorcet winner every candidate must be matched against every other candidate in a series of imaginary one-on-one contests. In each pairing the winner is the candidate preferred by a majority of voters. When results for every possible pairing have been found they are as follows:

Pair	Winner
Memphis (42%) vs. Nashville (58%)	Nashville
Memphis (42%) vs. Chattanooga (58%)	Chattanooga
Memphis (42%) vs. Knoxville (58%)	Knoxville
Nashville (68%) vs. Chattanooga (32%)	Nashville
Nashville (68%) vs. Knoxville (32%)	Nashville
Chattanooga (83%) vs. Knoxville (17%)	Chattanooga

The results can also be shown in the form of a matrix:

1st	Nashville [N]				3 Wins ↓
2nd	Chattanooga [C]			→ 1 Loss ↓ 2 Wins	[N] 68% [C] 32%
3rd	Knoxville [K]		→ 2 Losses ↓ 1 Win	[C] 83% [K] 17%	[N] 68% [K] 32%
4th	Memphis [M]	3 Losses →	[K] 58% [M] 42%	[C] 58% [M] 42%	[N] 58% [M] 42%

As can be seen from both of the tables above, Nashville beats every other candidate. This means that Nashville is the Condorcet winner. Nashville will thus win an election held under any possible Condorcet method.

While any Condorcet method will elect Nashville as the winner, if instead an election based on the same votes were held using first-past-the-post or instant-runoff voting, these systems would select Memphis (Note: The largest bloc (plurality) of first place votes is 42% for Memphis; no other rankings are considered. So even though 58%—a true majority—would be inconvenienced by having the capital at the most remote location, Memphis wins.) and Knoxville (Note: Chattanooga (15%) is eliminated in the first round; votes transfer to Knoxville. Nashville (26%) eliminated in the second around; votes transfer to Knoxville. Knoxville wins with 58%.) respectively. This would occur despite the fact that most people would have preferred Nashville to either of those "winners". Condorcet methods make these preferences obvious rather than ignoring or discarding them.

On the other hand, in this example Chattanooga also defeats Knoxville and Memphis when paired against those cities. If we changed the basis for defining preference and determined that Memphis voters preferred Chattanooga as a second choice rather than as a third choice, Chattanooga would be the Condorcet winner even though finishing in last place in a first-past-the-post election.

An alternative way of thinking about this example if a Smith-efficient Condorcet method that passes ISDA is used to determine the winner is that 58% of the voters, a mutual majority, ranked Memphis last (making Memphis the majority loser) and Nashville, Chattanooga, and Knoxville above Memphis, ruling Memphis out. At that point, the voters who preferred Memphis as their 1st choice could only help to choose a winner among Nashville, Chattanooga, and Knoxville, and because they all preferred Nashville as their 1st choice among those three, Nashville would have had a 68% majority of 1st choices among the remaining candidates and won as the majority's 1st choice.

== Circular ambiguities ==
As noted above, sometimes an election has no Condorcet winner because there is no candidate who is preferred by voters to all other candidates. When this occurs the situation is known as a 'Condorcet cycle', 'majority rule cycle', 'circular ambiguity', 'circular tie', 'Condorcet paradox', or simply a 'cycle'. This situation emerges when, once all votes have been tallied, the preferences of voters with respect to some candidates form a circle in which every candidate is beaten by at least one other candidate (intransitivity).

For example, if there are three candidates, Candidate Rock, Candidate Scissors, and Candidate Paper, there will be no Condorcet winner if voters prefer Candidate Rock over Candidate Scissors and Scissors over Paper, but also Candidate Paper over Rock. Depending on the context in which elections are held, circular ambiguities may or may not be common, but there is no known case of a governmental election with ranked-choice voting in which a circular ambiguity is evident from the record of ranked ballots. Nonetheless, a cycle is always possible, and so every Condorcet method should be capable of determining a winner when this contingency occurs. A mechanism for resolving an ambiguity is known as ambiguity resolution, cycle resolution method, or Condorcet completion method.

Circular ambiguities arise as a result of the voting paradox—the result of an election can be intransitive (forming a cycle) even though all individual voters expressed a transitive preference. In a Condorcet election it is impossible for the preferences of a single voter to be cyclical, because a voter must rank all candidates in order, from top-choice to bottom-choice, and can only rank each candidate once, but the paradox of voting means that it is still possible for a circular ambiguity in voter tallies to emerge.

The idealized notion of a political spectrum is often used to describe political candidates and policies. Where this kind of spectrum exists, and voters prefer candidates who are closest to their own position on the spectrum, there is a Condorcet winner (Black's Single-Peakedness Theorem).

In Condorcet methods, as in most electoral systems, there is also the possibility of an ordinary tie. This occurs when two or more candidates tie with each other but defeat every other candidate. As in other systems this can be resolved by a random method such as the drawing of lots. Ties can also be settled through other methods like seeing which of the tied winners had the most first choice votes, but this and some other non-random methods may re-introduce a degree of tactical voting, especially if voters know the race will be close.

The method used to resolve circular ambiguities is the main difference between the various Condorcet methods. There are countless ways in which this can be done, but every Condorcet method involves ignoring the majorities expressed by voters in at least some pairwise matchings. Some cycle resolution methods are Smith-efficient, meaning that they pass the Smith criterion. This guarantees that when there is a cycle (and no pairwise ties), only the candidates in the cycle can win, and that if there is a mutual majority, one of their preferred candidates will win.

Condorcet methods fit within two categories:

- Two-method systems, which use a separate method to handle cases in which there is no Condorcet winner
- One-method systems, which use a single method that, without any special handling, always identifies the winner to be the Condorcet winner

Many one-method systems and some two-method systems will give the same result as each other if there are fewer than 4 candidates in the circular tie, and all voters separately rank at least two of those candidates. These include Smith-Minimax (Minimax but done only after all candidates not in the Smith set are eliminated), Ranked Pairs, and Schulze. For example, with three candidates in the Smith set in a Condorcet cycle, because Schulze and Ranked Pairs pass ISDA, all candidates not in the Smith set can be eliminated first, and then for Schulze, dropping the weakest defeat of the three allows the candidate who had that weakest defeat to be the only candidate who can beat or tie all other candidates, while with Ranked Pairs, once the first two strongest defeats are locked in, the weakest cannot, since it'd create a cycle, and so the candidate with the weakest defeat will have no defeats locked in against them).

== Two-method systems ==
One family of Condorcet methods consists of systems that first conduct a series of pairwise comparisons and then, if there is no Condorcet winner, fall back to an entirely different, non-Condorcet method to determine a winner. The simplest such fall-back methods involve entirely disregarding the results of the pairwise comparisons. For example, the Black method chooses the Condorcet winner if it exists, but uses the Borda count instead if there is a cycle (the method is named for Duncan Black).

A more sophisticated two-stage process is, in the event of a cycle, to use a separate voting system to find the winner but to restrict this second stage to a certain subset of candidates found by scrutinizing the results of the pairwise comparisons. Sets used for this purpose are defined so that they will always contain only the Condorcet winner if there is one, and will always, in any case, contain at least one candidate. Such sets include the

- Smith set: The smallest non-empty set of candidates in a particular election such that every candidate in the set can beat all candidates outside the set. It is easily shown that there is only one possible Smith set for each election.
- Schwartz set: This is the innermost unbeaten set, and is usually the same as the Smith set. It is defined as the union of all possible sets of candidates such that for every set:
  1. Every candidate inside the set is pairwise unbeatable by any other candidate outside the set (i.e., ties are allowed).
  2. No proper (smaller) subset of the set fulfills the first property.
- Landau set or uncovered set or Fishburn set: the set of candidates, such that each member, for every other candidate (including those inside the set), either beats this candidate or beats a third candidate that itself beats the candidate that is unbeaten by the member.

One possible method is to apply instant-runoff voting in various ways, such as to the candidates of the Smith set. One variation of this method has been described as "Smith/IRV", with another being Tideman's alternative methods. It is also possible to do "Smith/Approval" by allowing voters to rank candidates, and indicate which candidates they approve, such that the candidate in the Smith set approved by the most voters wins; this is often done using an approval threshold (i.e. if voters approve their 3rd choices, those voters are automatically considered to approve their 1st and 2nd choices too). In Smith/Score, the candidate in the Smith set with the highest total score wins, with the pairwise comparisons done based on which candidates are scored higher than others.

== Single-method systems ==
Some Condorcet methods use a single procedure that inherently meets the Condorcet criteria and, without any extra procedure, also resolves circular ambiguities when they arise. In other words, these methods do not involve separate procedures for different situations. Typically these methods base their calculations on pairwise counts. These methods include:

- Copeland's method: This simple method involves electing the candidate who wins the most pairwise matchings. However, it often produces a tie.
- Kemeny method: This method ranks all the choices from most popular and second-most popular down to least popular.
- Minimax: Also called Simpson, Simpson–Kramer, and Simple Condorcet, this method chooses the candidate whose worst pairwise defeat is better than that of all other candidates. A refinement of this method involves restricting it to choosing a winner from among the Smith set; this has been called Smith/Minimax.
- Nanson's method and Baldwin's method combine Borda Count with an instant runoff procedure.
- Dodgson's method extends the Condorcet method by swapping candidates until a Condorcet winner is found. The winner is the candidate which requires the minimum number of swaps.
- Ranked pairs breaks each cycle in the pairwise preference graph by dropping the weakest majority in the cycle, thereby yielding a complete ranking of the candidates. This method is also known as Tideman, after its inventor Nicolaus Tideman.
- Schulze method iteratively drops the weakest majority in the pairwise preference graph until the winner becomes well defined. This method is also known as Schwartz sequential dropping (SSD), cloneproof Schwartz sequential dropping (CSSD), beatpath method, beatpath winner, path voting, and path winner.
- Smith Score is a rated voting method which elects the Score voting winner from the Smith set.

Ranked Pairs and Schulze are procedurally in some sense opposite approaches (although they very frequently give the same results):

- Ranked Pairs (and its variants) starts with the strongest defeats and uses as much information as it can without creating ambiguity.
- Schulze repeatedly removes the weakest defeat until the ambiguity is removed.

Minimax could be considered as more "blunt" than either of these approaches, as instead of removing defeats it can be seen as immediately removing candidates by looking at the strongest defeats (although their victories are still considered for subsequent candidate eliminations). One way to think of it in terms of removing defeats is that Minimax removes each candidate's weakest defeats until some group of candidates with only pairwise ties between them have no defeats left, at which point the group ties to win.

=== Kemeny method ===
The Kemeny method considers every possible sequence of choices in terms of which choice might be most popular, which choice might be second-most popular, and so on down to which choice might be least popular. Each such sequence is associated with a Kemeny score that is equal to the sum of the pairwise counts that apply to the specified sequence. The sequence with the highest score is identified as the overall ranking, from most popular to least popular.

When the pairwise counts are arranged in a matrix in which the choices appear in sequence from most popular (top and left) to least popular (bottom and right), the winning Kemeny score equals the sum of the counts in the upper-right, triangular half of the matrix (shown here in bold on a green background).

	...over Nashville	...over Chattanooga	...over Knoxville	...over Memphis
Prefer Nashville...	—	**68**	**68**	**58**
Prefer Chattanooga...	32	—	**83**	**58**
Prefer Knoxville...	32	17	—	**58**
Prefer Memphis...	42	42	42	—

In this example, the Kemeny Score of the sequence Nashville > Chattanooga > Knoxville > Memphis would be 393.

Calculating every Kemeny score requires considerable computation time in cases that involve more than a few choices. However, fast calculation methods based on integer programming allow a computation time in seconds for some cases with as many as 40 choices.

=== Ranked pairs ===
The order of finish is constructed a piece at a time by considering the (pairwise) majorities one at a time, from largest majority to smallest majority. For each majority, their higher-ranked candidate is placed ahead of their lower-ranked candidate in the (partially constructed) order of finish, except when their lower-ranked candidate has already been placed ahead of their higher-ranked candidate.

For example, suppose the voters' orders of preference are such that 75% rank B over C, 65% rank A over B, and 60% rank C over A. (The three majorities are a rock paper scissors cycle.) Ranked pairs begins with the largest majority, who rank B over C, and places B ahead of C in the order of finish. Then it considers the second largest majority, who rank A over B, and places A ahead of B in the order of finish. At this point, it has been established that A finishes ahead of B and B finishes ahead of C, which implies A also finishes ahead of C. So when ranked pairs considers the third largest majority, who rank C over A, their lower-ranked candidate A has already been placed ahead of their higher-ranked candidate C, so C is not placed ahead of A. The order of finish is "A, B, C" and A is the winner.

An equivalent definition is to find the order of finish that minimizes the size of the largest reversed majority. (In the 'lexicographical order' sense. If the largest majority reversed in two orders of finish is the same, the two orders of finish are compared by their second largest reversed majorities, etc. See the discussion of MinMax, MinLexMax and Ranked Pairs in the 'Motivation and uses' section of the Lexicographical Order article). (In the example, the order of finish "A, B, C" reverses the 60% who rank C over A. Any other order of finish would reverse a larger majority.) This definition is useful for simplifying some of the proofs of Ranked Pairs' properties, but the "constructive" definition executes much faster (small polynomial time).

=== Schulze method ===
The Schulze method resolves votes as follows:

At each stage, we proceed as follows:

1. For each pair of undropped candidates X and Y: If there is a directed path of undropped links from candidate X to candidate Y, then we write "X → Y"; otherwise we write "not X → Y".
2. For each pair of undropped candidates V and W: If "V → W" and "not W → V", then candidate W is dropped and all links, that start or end in candidate W, are dropped.
3. The weakest undropped link is dropped. If several undropped links tie as weakest, all of them are dropped.

The procedure ends when all links have been dropped. The winners are the undropped candidates.

In other words, this procedure repeatedly throws away the weakest pairwise defeat within the top set, until finally the number of votes left over produce an unambiguous decision.

=== Defeat strength ===
Some pairwise methods—including minimax, Ranked Pairs, and the Schulze method—resolve circular ambiguities based on the relative strength of the defeats. There are different ways to measure the strength of each defeat, and these include considering "winning votes" and "margins":

- Winning votes: The number of votes on the winning side of a defeat.
- Margins: The number of votes on the winning side of the defeat, minus the number of votes on the losing side of the defeat.

If voters do not rank their preferences for all of the candidates, these two approaches can yield different results. Consider, for example, the following election:

45 voters	11 voters	15 voters	29 voters
1. A	1. B	1. B	1. C
		2. C	2. B

The pairwise defeats are as follows:

- B beats A, 55 to 45 (55 winning votes, a margin of 10 votes)
- A beats C, 45 to 44 (45 winning votes, a margin of 1 vote)
- C beats B, 29 to 26 (29 winning votes, a margin of 3 votes)

Using the winning votes definition of defeat strength, the defeat of B by C is the weakest, and the defeat of A by B is the strongest. Using the margins definition of defeat strength, the defeat of C by A is the weakest, and the defeat of A by B is the strongest.

Using winning votes as the definition of defeat strength, candidate B would win under minimax, Ranked Pairs and the Schulze method, but, using margins as the definition of defeat strength, candidate C would win in the same methods.

If all voters give complete rankings of the candidates, then winning votes and margins will always produce the same result. The difference between them can only come into play when some voters declare equal preferences amongst candidates, as occurs implicitly if they do not rank all candidates, as in the example above.

The choice between margins and winning votes is the subject of scholarly debate. Because all Condorcet methods always choose the Condorcet winner when one exists, the difference between methods only appears when cyclic ambiguity resolution is required. The argument for using winning votes follows from this: Because cycle resolution involves disenfranchising a selection of votes, then the selection should disenfranchise the fewest possible number of votes. When margins are used, the difference between the number of two candidates' votes may be small, but the number of votes may be very large—or not. Only methods employing winning votes satisfy Woodall's plurality criterion.

An argument in favour of using margins is the fact that the result of a pairwise comparison is decided by the presence of more votes for one side than the other and thus that it follows naturally to assess the strength of a comparison by this "surplus" for the winning side. Otherwise, changing only a few votes from the winner to the loser could cause a sudden large change from a large score for one side to a large score for the other. In other words, one could consider losing votes being in fact disenfranchised when it comes to ambiguity resolution with winning votes. Also, using winning votes, a vote containing ties (possibly implicitly in the case of an incompletely ranked ballot) does not have the same effect as a number of equally weighted votes with total weight equaling one vote, such that the ties are broken in every possible way (a violation of Woodall's symmetric-completion criterion), as opposed to margins.

Under winning votes, if two more of the "B" voters decided to vote "BC", the A->C arm of the cycle would be overturned and Condorcet would pick C instead of B. This is an example of "Unburying" or "Later does harm". The margin method would pick C anyway.

Under the margin method, if three more "BC" voters decided to "bury" C by just voting "B", the A->C arm of the cycle would be strengthened and the resolution strategies would end up breaking the C->B arm and giving the win to B. This is an example of "Burying". The winning votes method would pick B anyway.

== Related terms ==
Other terms related to the Condorcet method are:

Condorcet loser
the candidate who is less preferred than every other candidate in a pairwise matchup (preferred by fewer voters than any other candidate).
Weak Condorcet winner
a candidate who beats or ties with every other candidate in a pairwise matchup (preferred by at least as many voters as any other candidate). There can be more than one weak Condorcet winner.
Weak Condorcet loser
a candidate who is defeated by or ties with every other candidate in a pairwise matchup. Similarly, there can be more than one weak Condorcet loser.

== Condorcet ranking methods ==
Some Condorcet methods produce not just a single winner, but a ranking of all candidates from first to last place. A Condorcet ranking is a list of candidates with the property that the Condorcet winner (if one exists) comes first and the Condorcet loser (if one exists) comes last, and this holds recursively for the candidates ranked between them.

Single winner methods that satisfy this property include:

- Copeland's method
- Kemeny method
- Ranked pairs
- Schulze method

Proportional forms which satisfy this property include:

- CPO-STV
- Schulze STV

Though there will not always be a Condorcet winner or Condorcet loser, there is always a Smith set and "Smith loser set" (smallest group of candidates who lose to all candidates not in the set in head-to-head elections). Some voting methods produce rankings that sort all candidates in the Smith set above all others, and all candidates in the Smith loser set below all others, with this holding recursively for all candidates ranked between them; in essence, this guarantees that when the candidates can be split into two groups, such that every candidate in the first group beats every candidate in the second group head-to-head, then all candidates in the first group are ranked higher than all candidates in the second group. Because the Smith set and Smith loser set are equivalent to the Condorcet winner and Condorcet loser when they exist, methods that always produce Smith set rankings also always produce Condorcet rankings.

== Comparison with instant runoff and first-past-the-post (plurality) ==
One claim of some instant-runoff voting (IRV) proponents is that if a voter's first choice does not win, then their vote will transfer to their second choice; if their second choice does not win, their vote will transfer to their third choice, etc. In practice, it is not true for every voter with IRV and is never true for voters whose first choice loses in the IRV final round. Most often, this makes no difference in the outcome of the IRV election, but in the case that IRV does not elect the Condorcet Winner, then this does make a difference.

If someone voted for a strong candidate, and their 2nd and 3rd choices are eliminated before their first choice is eliminated, IRV transfers their vote to their 4th choice candidate, not their 2nd choice. Condorcet voting takes all rankings into account simultaneously, but at the expense of violating the later-no-harm criterion and the later-no-help criterion. With IRV, indicating a second choice will never affect your first choice. With Condorcet voting, it is possible that indicating a second choice will cause your first choice to lose, however this happens only when there is a cycle.

Plurality voting is simple, and theoretically provides incentives for voters to compromise for centrist candidates rather than throw away their votes on candidates who cannot win. Opponents to plurality voting point out that voters often vote for the lesser of evils because they heard on the news that those two are the only two with a chance of winning, not necessarily because those two are the two natural compromises. This gives the media significant election powers. And if voters do compromise according to the media, the post election counts will prove the media right for next time. Condorcet runs each candidate against the other head to head, so that voters elect the candidate who would win the most sincere runoffs, instead of the one they thought they had to vote for.

There are circumstances, as in the examples above, when both instant-runoff voting and the "first-past-the-post" plurality system will fail to pick the Condorcet winner. (In fact, FPTP can elect the Condorcet loser and IRV can elect the second-worst candidate, who would lose to every candidate except the Condorcet loser.) In cases where there is a Condorcet Winner, and where IRV does not choose it, a majority would by definition prefer the Condorcet Winner to the IRV winner. Proponents of the Condorcet criterion see it as a principal issue in selecting an electoral system. They see the Condorcet criterion as a natural extension of majority rule. Condorcet methods tend to encourage the selection of centrist candidates who appeal to the median voter. Here is an example that is designed to support IRV at the expense of Condorcet:

499 voters	3 voters	498 voters
1. A	1. B	1. C
2. B	2. C	2. B
3. C	3. A	3. A

B is preferred by a 501–499 majority to A, and by a 502–498 majority to C. So, according to the Condorcet criterion, B should win, despite the fact that very few voters rank B in first place. By contrast, IRV elects C and plurality elects A. The goal of a ranked voting system is for voters to be able to vote sincerely and trust the system to protect their intent. Plurality voting forces voters to do all their tactics before they vote, so that the system does not need to figure out their intent.

The significance of this scenario, of two parties with strong support, and the one with weak support being the Condorcet winner, may be misleading, though, as it is a common mode in plurality voting systems (see Duverger's law), but much less likely to occur in Condorcet or IRV elections, which unlike Plurality voting, punish candidates who alienate a significant block of voters.

Here is an example that is designed to support Condorcet at the expense of IRV:

33 voters	16 voters	16 voters	35 voters
1. A	1. B	1. B	1. C
2. B	2. A	2. C	2. B
3. C	3. C	3. A	3. A

B would win against either A or C by more than a 65–35 margin in a one-on-one election, but IRV eliminates B first, leaving a contest between the more "polar" candidates, A and C. Proponents of plurality voting state that their system is simpler than any other and more easily understood.

All three systems are susceptible to tactical voting, but the types of tactics used and the frequency of strategic incentive differ in each method.

== Potential for tactical voting ==
Like all voting methods, Condorcet methods are vulnerable to compromising. That is, voters can help avoid the election of a less-preferred candidate by insincerely raising the position of a more-preferred candidate on their ballot. However, Condorcet methods are only vulnerable to compromising when there is a majority rule cycle, or when one can be created.

Condorcet methods are vulnerable to burying. In some elections, voters can help a more-preferred candidate by insincerely lowering the position of a less-preferred candidate on their ballot. For example, in an election with three candidates, voters may be able to falsify their second choice to help their preferred candidate win.

Example with the Schulze method:

46 voters	44 voters	10 voters
1. A	1. B	1. C
2. B	2. A	2. B
3. C	3. C	3. A

- B is the sincere Condorcet winner. But since A has the most votes and almost has a majority, with A and B forming a mutual majority of 90% of the voters, A can win by publicly instructing A voters to bury B with C (see * below), using B-top voters' 2nd choice support to win the election. If B, after hearing the public instructions, reciprocates by burying A with C, C will be elected, and this threat may be enough to keep A from pushing for his tactic. B's other possible recourse would be to attack A's ethics in proposing the tactic and call for all voters to vote sincerely. This is an example of the chicken dilemma.

46 voters	44 voters	10 voters
1. A	1. B	1. C
2. C*	2. A	2. B
3. B*	3. C	3. A

- B beats A by 8 as before, and A beats C by 82 as before, but now C beats B by 12, forming a Smith set greater than one. Even the Schulze method elects A: The path strength of A beats B is the lesser of 82 and 12, so 12. The path strength of B beats A is only 8, which is less than 12, so A wins. B voters are powerless to do anything about the public announcement by A, and C voters just hope B reciprocates, or maybe consider compromise voting for B if they dislike A enough.

Supporters of Condorcet methods which exhibit this potential problem could rebut this concern by pointing out that pre-election polls are most necessary with plurality voting, and that voters, armed with ranked choice voting, could lie to pre-election pollsters, making it impossible for Candidate A to know whether or how to bury. It is also nearly impossible to predict ahead of time how many supporters of A would actually follow the instructions, and how many would be alienated by such an obvious attempt to manipulate the system.

33 voters	16 voters	16 voters	35 voters
1. A	1. B	1. B	1. C
2. B	2. A	2. C	2. B
3. C	3. C	3. A	3. A

- In the above example, if C voters bury B with A, A will be elected instead of B. Since C voters prefer B to A, only they would be hurt by attempting the burying. Except for the first example where one candidate has the most votes and has a near majority, the Schulze method is very resistant to burying.

== Evaluation by criteria ==
Scholars of electoral systems often compare them using mathematically defined voting system criteria. The criteria which Condorcet methods satisfy vary from one Condorcet method to another. However, the Condorcet criterion is incompatible with the consistency, independence of irrelevant alternatives (though it implies a weaker analogous form of IIA: when there is a Condorcet winner, losing candidates can drop out of the election without changing the result), later-no-harm, later-no-help, participation, and sincere favorite criteria.

Voting system criterion Condorcet method	Monotonic	Condorcet loser	Clone independence	Reversal symmetry	Polynomial time	Resolvable	Local independence of irrelevant alternatives
Schulze	Yes	Yes	Yes	Yes	Yes	Yes	No
Ranked Pairs	Yes	Yes	Yes	Yes	Yes	Yes	Yes
Minimax	Yes	No	No	No	Yes	Yes	No
Nanson	No	Yes	No	Yes	Yes	Unknown	Unknown
Kemeny	Yes	Yes	No	Yes	No	Yes	Yes
Dodgson	No	No	No	No	No	Unknown	Unknown
Copeland	Yes	Yes	No	Yes	Yes	No	No

== Use of Condorcet voting ==
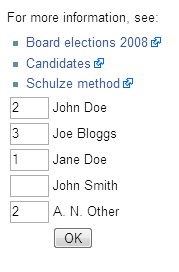
sample ballot for Wikimedia's Board of Trustees elections

Condorcet methods are not known to be currently in use in government elections anywhere in the world, but a Condorcet method known as Nanson's method was used in city elections in the U.S. town of Marquette, Michigan in the 1920s, and today Condorcet methods are used by a number of political parties and private organizations.

In Vermont, Bill H.424 would enable towns, cities, and villages to adopt a Condorcet-based voting system for single-seat office elections through a majority vote at a town meeting. The system first checks for a majority winner among first preferences. If none, pairwise Condorcet comparisons are counted and the Condorcet winner is elected. If none, it resorts to a first-past-the-post tiebreaker. Once adopted, the system remains in effect until the community decides to revert to a previous method or another system through a subsequent town meeting vote.

Organizations which currently use some variant of the Condorcet method are:

- The Libertarian Party of Washington allows for a Condorcet method, in addition to other systems
- The Free State Project used Minimax for choosing its target state
- The uk.* hierarchy of Usenet uses a Condorcet method
- Baldwin's method was in use by the Trinity College Dialectic Society around 1864.
- Schulze method is used in many places. Some examples:
  - The Wikimedia Foundation used the Schulze method to elect its Board of Trustees until 2013, when it switched to a ratings ballot with Support/Neutral/Oppose ballots.
  - The Pirate Party of Sweden uses the Schulze method for its primaries
  - The Debian project uses the Schulze method for internal referendums and to elect its leader
  - The Software in the Public Interest corporation uses the Schulze method for internal referendums and to elect its board of directors
  - The Gentoo Foundation uses the Schulze method for internal referendums and to elect its board of trustees and its council
  - Kingman Hall and Hillegass Parker House, two loosely affiliated student housing cooperatives, each use the Schulze method to elect their management teams.
  - The Kubernetes community uses Elekto's implementation of the Schulze method.
  - The Schulze method article has a longer list of users of that method.

== See also ==
- Condorcet loser criterion
- Condorcet's jury theorem
- Ramon Llull (1232–1315) who, with the 2001 discovery of his lost manuscripts Ars notandi, Ars eleccionis, and Alia ars eleccionis, was given credit for discovering the Borda count and Condorcet criterion (Llull winner) in the 13th century
- Multiwinner voting—contains information on some multiwinner variants of Condorcet methods.
