= Nanson's method =

Single-winner electoral system

The Borda count electoral system can be combined with an instant-runoff procedure to create hybrid election methods that are called Nanson's method and Baldwin's method. Both methods are designed to satisfy the Condorcet criterion, and allow for incomplete ballots and equal rankings.

== Nanson's method ==
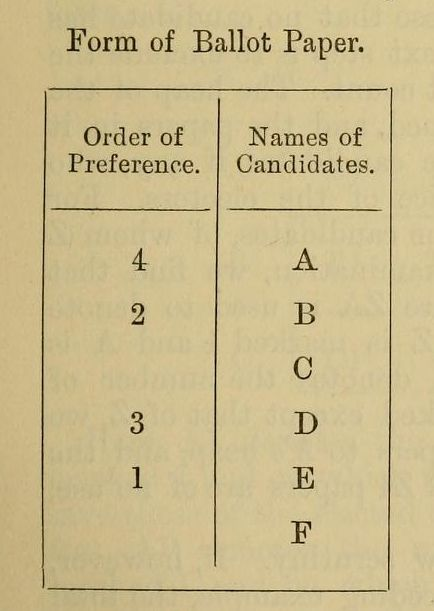
A ranked ballot with incomplete preferences, as illustrated by Nanson.

Nanson's method is based on the original work of the mathematician Edward J. Nanson in 1882. Nanson's method eliminates those choices from a Borda count tally that are at or below the average Borda count score, then the ballots are retallied as if only the remaining candidates had been on the ballot. This process is repeated if necessary until a single winner remains.

If a Condorcet winner exists, they will be elected. If not (that is, if there is a Condorcet cycle), then the preference with the smallest majority will be eliminated.

Nanson's method can be adapted to handle incomplete ballots (including "plumping") and equal rankings ("bracketing"), though he describes two different methods to handle these cases: a theoretically correct method involving fractions of a vote, and a practical method involving whole numbers (which has the side effect of diminishing the voting power of voters who plump or bracket). This then allows the use of approval-style voting for voters who merely wish to approve of some candidates and disapprove of others.

The method can be adapted to multi-winner elections by removing the name of a winner from the ballots and re-calculating, though this just elects the highest-ranked n candidates and does not result in proportional representation.

In 1986, Schwartz studied a slight variant of Nanson's rule, in which candidates less than but not equal to the average Borda count score are eliminated in each round.

== Baldwin's method ==
Candidates are voted for on ranked ballots as in the Borda count. Then, the points are tallied in a series of rounds. In each round, the candidate with the fewest points is eliminated, and the points are re-tallied as if that candidate were not on the ballot.

This method predates Nanson's, who notes it was already in use by the Trinity College Dialectic Society. It was systematized by Joseph M. Baldwin in 1926, who incorporated a more efficient matrix tabulation and extended it to support incomplete ballots and equal rankings, by counting fractional points in such cases.

The two methods have been confused with each other in some literature.

This system has been proposed for use in the United States under the name "Total Vote Runoff", by Edward B. Foley and Eric Maskin, as a way to fix what they perceived as problems with instant-runoff voting in U.S. jurisdictions that use it.

== Satisfied and failed criteria ==
Nanson's method and Baldwin's method satisfy the Condorcet criterion: because Borda always gives any existing Condorcet winner more than the average Borda points, a Condorcet winner will never be eliminated.

They do not satisfy the independence of irrelevant alternatives criterion, the monotonicity criterion, the participation criterion, the consistency criterion or the independence of clones criterion, while they do satisfy the majority criterion, the mutual majority criterion, the Condorcet loser criterion and the Smith criterion. Nanson's method satisfies reversal symmetry, but Baldwin's method does not.

Both Nanson's and Baldwin's methods can be run in polynomial time to obtain a single winner. For Baldwin's method, however, at each stage, there might be several candidates with lowest Borda score, and different choices of which candidate to eliminate can result in different ultimate outcomes. In fact, it is NP-complete to decide whether a given candidate is a Baldwin winner, i.e., whether there exists an elimination sequence that leaves a given candidate uneliminated.

Both methods are computationally more difficult to manipulate than Borda's method.

== Use of the methods ==
Nanson's method was used in city elections in Marquette, Michigan, US in the 1920s. It was formerly used by the Anglican Diocese of Melbourne and in the election of members of the University Council of the University of Adelaide. It was used by the University of Melbourne until 1983.
