= Condorcet efficiency =

Performance metric for voting methods

Efficiency of several voting systems with a spatial model and candidates distributed similarly to the 201 voters

As candidates become more ideologically clustered relative to the voter distribution, some voting methods perform more poorly at finding the Condorcet winner.

Condorcet efficiency is a measurement of the performance of voting methods. It is defined as the percentage of elections for which the Condorcet winner (the candidate who is preferred over all others in head-to-head races) is elected, provided there is one.

A voting method with 100% efficiency would always pick the Condorcet winner, when one exists, and a method that never chose the Condorcet winner would have 0% efficiency.

Efficiency is not only affected by the voting method, but is a function of the number of voters, number of candidates, and of any strategies used by the voters.

It was initially developed in 1984 by Samuel Merrill III, along with social utility efficiency.

A related, generalized measure is Smith efficiency, which measures how often a voting method elects a candidate in the Smith set. Smith efficiency can be used to differentiate between voting methods across all elections, because unlike the Condorcet winner, the Smith set always exists. A 100% Smith-efficient method is guaranteed to be 100% Condorcet-efficient, and likewise with 0%.

== See also ==
- Social utility efficiency
- Comparison of electoral systems
