= Motion and amendment =

Electoral system

A motion and amendment electoral system decides the result of the election by following standard rules for adopting other proposals. The steps are:

1. A substantive motion is proposed that "individual A is elected".
2. Proposals for amendments are invited. If none are received then move to step 4.
3. If an amendment is proposed that the motion be changed by deleting "A" and inserting "B" then that is voted on. If the amendment is carried then the substantive motion becomes "individual B is elected". In either case the process returns to step 2.
4. With no more proposed amendments, the substantive motion is put to the vote. If it is carried then the election is complete. If not then the process returns to step 1, or stops without a result.

This was the system used for the election of the Speaker of the House of Commons until 2001.

If there is a Condorcet winner and people vote according to their preferences, then that individual will be considered in the final vote on the motion in step 4. If there is not a Condorcet winner then any person in the final motion will be a member of the Smith set; which individual that is may depend on who is nominated at which stage. However, there is no guarantee that a motion will pass at the end.

== An example ==

Suppose that Tennessee is holding an election on the location of its capital. The population is concentrated around four major cities. All voters want the capital to be as close to them as possible. The options are:

- Memphis, the largest city, but far from the others (42% of voters)
- Nashville, near the center of the state (26% of voters)
- Chattanooga, somewhat east (15% of voters)
- Knoxville, far to the northeast (17% of voters)

The preferences of each region's voters are:

| 42% of voters Far-West | 26% of voters Center | 15% of voters Center-East | 17% of voters Far-East |
|---|---|---|---|
| 1. Memphis; 2. Nashville; 3. Chattanooga; 4. Knoxville | 1. Nashville; 2. Chattanooga; 3. Knoxville; 4. Memphis | 1. Chattanooga; 2. Knoxville; 3. Nashville; 4. Memphis | 1. Knoxville; 2. Chattanooga; 3. Nashville; 4. Memphis |

The voting might go as follows:

1. Motion proposed "Memphis shall be the capital of Tennessee."
2. Amendment proposed "Delete 'Memphis' and insert 'Nashville'." Passed 58% to 42% so motion becomes "Nashville shall be the capital of Tennessee."
3. Amendment proposed "Delete 'Nashville' and insert 'Chattanooga'." Rejected 68% to 32% so motion remains "Nashville shall be the capital of Tennessee."
4. Amendment proposed "Delete 'Nashville' and insert 'Knoxville'." Rejected 68% to 32% so motion remains "Nashville shall be the capital of Tennessee."
5. Vote on motion "Nashville shall be the capital of Tennessee." Outcome uncertain, as it depends on whether supporters of other cities are willing to accept Nashville rather than failing to make a decision at this stage.

== Tactical voting and tactical nomination ==
Motion and amendment is prone to tactical voting. The result may also depend on the order in which candidates are considered.

In the example above, if supporters of Knoxville pretended to prefer Memphis over Nashville or Chattanooga, they could enable Knoxville to appear in the final motion. The voting would have been:

1. Motion proposed "Memphis shall be the capital of Tennessee."
2. Amendment proposed "Delete 'Memphis' and insert 'Nashville'." Rejected 59% to 41% so motion remains "Memphis shall be the capital of Tennessee."
3. Amendment proposed "Delete 'Memphis' and insert 'Chattanooga'." Rejected 59% to 41% so motion remains "Memphis shall be the capital of Tennessee."
4. Amendment proposed "Delete 'Memphis' and insert 'Knoxville'." Passed 58% to 42% so motion becomes "Knoxville shall be the capital of Tennessee."
5. Vote on motion "Knoxville shall be the capital of Tennessee." Outcome uncertain.

This particular tactical voting would not work if Knoxville had been nominated before Memphis or Chattanooga.
