= Social utility efficiency =

Performance metric for voting methods

Efficiency of several voting systems with an impartial culture model and 25 voters

Social utility efficiency (SUE) or voter satisfaction efficiency (VSE) is a metric for comparing voting methods which compares them based on the average well-being of voters.

It is also known as utilitarian efficiency or voter satisfaction index (VSI).

== Definition ==
Social utility efficiency is defined as the ratio between the social utility of the candidate who is actually elected by a given voting method and that of the candidate who would maximize social utility (relative to a random winner baseline), where $E[]$ is the expected value over many iterations of the sum of all voter utilities for a given candidate:

$$\operatorname{SUE}= \frac{E[\text{selected candidate}]-E[\text{random candidate}]}{E[\text{maximizing candidate}]-E[\text{random candidate}]}$$

A voting method with 100% efficiency would always pick the candidate that maximizes voter utility. A method that chooses a winner randomly would have efficiency of 0%, and a (pathological) method that did worse than a random pick would have less than 0% efficiency.

SUE is not only affected by the voting method, but is a function of the number of voters, number of candidates, and of any strategies used by the voters.

== History ==
The concept was originally introduced as a system's "effectiveness" by Robert J. Weber in 1977, defined as:

$$\operatorname{Effectiveness}=\lim_{n \to \infty} \frac {E_\text{elected}(m,n) - E_\text{random}(m)}{E_\text{maximal}(m,n) - E_\text{random}(m)}$$

Where $E$ is the expected social utility of the given candidate, $n$ is the number of voters, and $m$ is the number of candidates. He used a random society (impartial culture) model to analytically calculate the effectiveness of FPTP, two Approval variants, and Borda, as the number of voters approaches infinity.

It was given the name "social utility efficiency" and extended to the more realistic spatial model of voting by Samuel Merrill III in the 1980s, calculated statistically from random samples, with 25–201 voters and 2–10 candidates. This analysis included FPTP, Runoff, IRV, Coombs, Approval, Black, and Borda (roughly in increasing order of efficiency). (Merrill's model normalizes individual voter utility before finding the utility winner, while Weber's does not, so that Merrill considers all 2-candidate voting systems to have an SUE of 100%, decreasing with more candidates, while Weber considers them to have an effectiveness of $\sqrt{2/3}$ = 81.6%, with some systems increasing with more candidates.)

In 2017, Jameson Quinn studied SUE under the name "voter satisfaction efficiency", using more complex and arguably more realistic parameters, examining a wider variety of scenarios and using a hierarchical cluster model of voter behavior. He found the best performers to be ranked pairs, STAR voting, and score voting, depending on the scenario tested.

== Related metrics ==
A similar metric, referred to as "Bayesian regret", measures the same property, but inverted. They are related by the formula:

$$\operatorname{SUE}(\text{method}) = 1 - \frac{\operatorname{BR}(\text{method})}{\operatorname{BR}(\text{random winner})}$$

where "random winner" refers to the hypothetical election method of choosing a candidate at random regardless of the opinions of the electorate (not the random ballot voting method, which is weighted towards candidates who receive more votes).

While the term "utilitarian efficiency" has been used as a synonym for SUE, it has also been used to mean the probability of electing the utilitarian winner (analogous to Condorcet efficiency).

In 2023, Robinette introduced a variant of social utility efficiency that compares voting rules under strategic candidate repositioning, measuring the utility of the repositioned winning candidate against the maximum utility achievable from the candidates' initial positions.

In 2025, Holliday and Pacuit introduced expected social utility performance (ESUP), a variant of SUE that averages the per‑election normalized utility rather than the ratio of expected utilities across all elections. They conducted a large‑scale simulation across 36 voting methods, using a spatial model with 15 parameters and nearly one million CPU hours, confirming that Condorcet and Borda methods achieve the highest expected social utility, while IRV and Plurality perform significantly worse.

== See also ==
- Condorcet efficiency
- Comparison of electoral systems
