= Peter C. Fishburn =

American mathematician (1936–2021)

- Born: 2 September 1936; Philipsburg, Pennsylvania
- Died: 10 June 2021 (aged 84); Racine, Wisconsin
- Education: Pennsylvania State University (B.S. 1958); Case Institute of Technology (M.S. 1961, Ph. D. 1962)
- Known for: Decision Theory
- Awards: John von Neumann Theory Prize (1996); Decision Analysis Publication Award; Frank P. Ramsey Medal
- Scientific career
- Fields: Decision Theory
- Workplaces: AT&T Bell Laboratories
- Thesis: A Normative Theory of Decisions under Risk (1962)
- Doctoral advisor: Russell Ackoff

Peter Clingerman Fishburn (September 2, 1936 – June 10, 2021) was an American mathematician, known as a pioneer in the field of decision theory. In collaboration with Steven Brams, Fishburn published a paper about approval voting in 1978.

== Biography ==
=== Intellectual ===
Fishburn received his B.S. in industrial engineering from Pennsylvania State University in 1958, his M.S. in operations research in 1961, and a Ph.D. in operations research in 1962, the latter two from the Case Institute of Technology.

In collaboration with Steven Brams, Fishburn published a paper about approval voting in 1978. In 1996, he won the John von Neumann Theory Prize. He also won the Decision Analysis Publication Award in 1991 and the Frank P. Ramsey Medal in 1987.

He was elected to the 2002 class of Fellows of the Institute for Operations Research and the Management Sciences.

=== Personal ===
Fishburn retired after many years of research at AT&T Bell Laboratories in the state of New Jersey, United States. He was married to the theologian Janet Forsythe Fishburn. He died on June 10, 2021, in Racine, Wisconsin.

== See also ==
- Fishburn set
- Fishburn–Shepp inequality
- Maximal lotteries
