= John H. Smith (mathematician) =

American mathematician

John Howard Smith is an American mathematician and retired professor of mathematics at Boston College. He received his Ph.D. from the Massachusetts Institute of Technology in 1963, under the supervision of Kenkichi Iwasawa. In voting theory, he is known for the Smith set, the smallest nonempty set of candidates such that, in every pairwise matchup (two-candidate election/runoff) between a member and a non-member, the member is the winner by majority rule, and for the Smith criterion, a property of certain election systems in which the winner is guaranteed to belong to the Smith set. He has also made contributions to spectral graph theory and additive number theory.
