= Condorcet loser criterion =

Property of electoral systems

In single-winner voting system theory, the Condorcet loser criterion (CLC) is a measure for differentiating voting systems. It implies the majority loser criterion but does not imply the Condorcet winner criterion.

A voting system complying with the Condorcet loser criterion will never allow a Condorcet loser to win. A Condorcet loser is a candidate who can be defeated in a head-to-head competition against each other candidate. (Not all elections will have a Condorcet loser since it is possible for three or more candidates to be mutually defeatable in different head-to-head competitions.)

== Compliance ==
Compliant methods include: two-round system, instant-runoff voting (AV), contingent vote, Borda count, Schulze method, ranked pairs, and Kemeny method. Any voting method that ends in a runoff passes the criterion, so long as all voters are able to express their preferences in that runoff i.e. STAR voting passes only when voters can always indicate their ranked preference in their scores; if there are more than 6 candidates, then this is impossible.

Noncompliant methods include: plurality voting, supplementary voting, Sri Lankan contingent voting, approval voting, range voting, Bucklin voting and Minimax Condorcet.

The Smith criterion implies the Condorcet loser criterion, because no candidate in the Smith set can lose a head-to-head matchup against a candidate not in the Smith set.

== Examples ==
=== Approval voting ===
The ballots for approval voting do not contain the information to identify the Condorcet loser. Thus, approval voting cannot prevent the Condorcet loser from winning in some cases. The following example shows that approval voting violates the Condorcet loser criterion.

Assume four candidates A, B, C and L with 3 voters with the following preferences:

# of voters	Preferences
1	A > B > L > C
1	B > C > L > A
1	C > A > L > B

The Condorcet loser is L, since every other candidate is preferred to him by 2 out of 3 voters.

There are several possibilities how the voters could translate their preference order into an approval ballot, i.e. where they set the threshold between approvals and disapprovals. For example, the first voter could approve (i) only A or (ii) A and B or (iii) A, B and L or (iv) all candidates or (v) none of them. Let's assume, that all voters approve three candidates and disapprove only the last one. The approval ballots would be:

# of voters	Approvals	Disapprovals
1	A, B, L	C
1	B, C, L	A
1	A, C, L	B

Result: L is approved by all three voters, whereas the three other candidates are approved by only two voters. Thus, the Condorcet loser L is elected the approval winner.

Note, that if any voter would set the threshold between approvals and disapprovals at any other place, the Condorcet loser L would not be the (single) Approval winner. However, since approval voting elects the Condorcet loser in the example, approval voting fails the Condorcet loser criterion.

=== Majority judgment ===
This example shows that majority judgment violates the Condorcet loser criterion. Assume three candidates A, B and L and 3 voters with the following opinions:

Candidates/ # of voters	A	B	L
1	Excellent	Bad	Good
1	Bad	Excellent	Good
1	Fair	Poor	Bad

The sorted ratings would be as follows:

Candidate	↓ / Median point
L
A
B
	Excellent / Good / Fair / Poor / Bad

L has the median rating "Good", A has the median rating "Fair" and B has the median rating "Poor". Thus, L is the majority judgment winner.

Now, the Condorcet loser is determined. If all informations are removed that are not considered to determine the Condorcet loser, we have:

# of voters	Preferences
1	A > L > B
1	B > L > A
1	A > B > L

A is preferred over L by two voters and B is preferred over L by two voters. Thus, L is the Condorcet loser.

Result: L is the Condorcet loser. However, while the voter least preferring L also rates A and B relatively low, the other two voters rate L close to their favorites. Thus, L is elected majority judgment winner. Hence, majority judgment fails the Condorcet loser criterion.

=== Minimax ===
This example shows that the Minimax method violates the Condorcet loser criterion. Assume four candidates A, B, C and L with 9 voters with the following preferences:

# of voters	Preferences
1	A > B > C > L
1	A > B > L > C
3	B > C > A > L
1	C > L > A > B
1	L > A > B > C
2	L > C > A > B

Since all preferences are strict rankings (no equals are present), all three Minimax methods (winning votes, margins and pairwise opposite) elect the same winners:

Pairwise election results
		X			
		A	B	C	L
Y	A		[X] 3 [Y] 6	[X] 6 [Y] 3	[X] 4 [Y] 5
Y	B	[X] 6 [Y] 3		[X] 3 [Y] 6	[X] 4 [Y] 5
Y	C	[X] 3 [Y] 6	[X] 6 [Y] 3		[X] 4 [Y] 5
Y	L	[X] 5 [Y] 4	[X] 5 [Y] 4	[X] 5 [Y] 4	
Pairwise election results (won-tied-lost):		2-0-1	2-0-1	2-0-1	0-0-3
worst pairwise defeat (winning votes):		6	6	6	5
worst pairwise defeat (margins):		3	3	3	1
worst pairwise opposition:		6	6	6	5

- [X] indicates voters who preferred the candidate listed in the column caption to the candidate listed in the row caption
- [Y] indicates voters who preferred the candidate listed in the row caption to the candidate listed in the column caption

Result: L loses against all other candidates and, thus, is Condorcet loser. However, the candidates A, B and C form a cycle with clear defeats. L benefits from that since it loses relatively closely against all three and therefore L's biggest defeat is the closest of all candidates. Thus, the Condorcet loser L is elected Minimax winner. Hence, the Minimax method fails the Condorcet loser criterion.

=== Plurality voting ===

Suppose that Tennessee is holding an election on the location of its capital. The population is concentrated around four major cities. All voters want the capital to be as close to them as possible. The options are:

- Memphis, the largest city, but far from the others (42% of voters)
- Nashville, near the center of the state (26% of voters)
- Chattanooga, somewhat east (15% of voters)
- Knoxville, far to the northeast (17% of voters)

The preferences of each region's voters are:

42% of voters Far-West	26% of voters Center	15% of voters Center-East	17% of voters Far-East
1. Memphis; 2. Nashville; 3. Chattanooga; 4. Knoxville	1. Nashville; 2. Chattanooga; 3. Knoxville; 4. Memphis	1. Chattanooga; 2. Knoxville; 3. Nashville; 4. Memphis	1. Knoxville; 2. Chattanooga; 3. Nashville; 4. Memphis

Here, Memphis has a plurality (42%) of the first preferences, so would be the winner under simple plurality voting. However, the majority (58%) of voters have Memphis as their fourth preference, and if two of the remaining three cities were not in the running to become the capital, Memphis would lose all of the contests 58–42. Hence, Memphis is the Condorcet loser.

=== Range voting ===
This example shows that range voting violates the Condorcet loser criterion. Assume two candidates A and L and 3 voters with the following opinions:

	Scores	
# of voters	A	L
2	6	5
1	0	10

The total scores would be:

	Scores	
candidate	Sum	Average
A	12	4
L	20	6.7

Hence, L is the Range voting winner.

Now, the Condorcet loser is determined. If all informations are removed that are not considered to determine the Condorcet loser, we have:

# of voters	Preferences
2	A > L
1	L > A

Thus, L would be the Condorcet loser.

Result: L is preferred only by one of the three voters, so L is the Condorcet loser. However, while the two voters preferring A over L rate both candidates nearly equal and L's supporter rates him clearly over A, L is elected range voting winner. Hence, range voting fails the Condorcet loser criterion.

== See also ==
- Condorcet method
- Condorcet winner criterion
