= Maximal lotteries =

Probabilistic Condorcet method

Maximal lotteries are a probabilistic voting rule that use ranked ballots and returns a lottery over candidates that a majority of voters will prefer, in expectation, to any other. More formally, the rule has the property that, when averaging over a series of repeated head-to-head matchups, at least half of all voters will prefer the result of a maximal lottery to the result produced by any other voting rule.

Maximal lotteries satisfy a wide range of desirable properties: they elect the Condorcet winner with probability 1 if it exists and never elect candidates outside the Smith set. Moreover, they satisfy independence of clones. The probabilistic voting rule that returns all maximal lotteries is the only rule satisfying reinforcement, Condorcet-consistency, and independence of clones. The social welfare function that top-ranks maximal lotteries has been uniquely characterized using Arrow's independence of irrelevant alternatives and Pareto efficiency.

Maximal lotteries do not satisfy the standard notion of strategyproofness, as Allan Gibbard has shown that only random dictatorships can satisfy strategyproofness and ex post efficiency. Maximal lotteries are also nonmonotonic in probabilities, meaning it is possible for the probability of an alternative to decrease if this alternative up. However, they satisfy relative monotonicity, the probability of $x$ relative to that of $y$ does not decrease when $x$ is improved over $y$.

The maximal lottery satisfies some generalizations of reinforcement and participation to the non-deterministic case: the probability of superiority exceeds 50%, meaning a voter will prefer the result they get by participating to the one they get by not participating more than half the time. However, a maximal lottery can still exhibit a no-show paradox in the expected utility sense, so a voter feels the lottery they get by voting is worse (has lower expected utility) than the lottery they would receive if they had not turned out.

The support of maximal lotteries, which is known as the essential set or the bipartisan set, has been studied in detail.

== History ==
Maximal lotteries were first proposed by the French mathematician and social scientist Germain Kreweras in 1965 and popularized by Peter Fishburn. Since then, they have been rediscovered multiple times by economists, mathematicians, political scientists, philosophers, and computer scientists.

Several natural dynamics that converge to maximal lotteries have been observed in biology, physics, chemistry, and machine learning.

== Collective preferences over lotteries ==
The input to this voting system consists of the agents' ordinal preferences over outcomes (not lotteries over alternatives), but a relation on the set of lotteries can be constructed in the following way: if $p$ and $q$ are lotteries over alternatives, $p\succ q$ if the expected value of the margin of victory of an outcome selected with distribution $p$ in a head-to-head vote against an outcome selected with distribution $q$ is positive. In other words, $p\succ q$ if it is more likely that a randomly selected voter will prefer the alternatives sampled from $p$ to the alternative sampled from $q$ than vice versa. While this relation is not necessarily transitive, it does always admit at least one maximal element.

It is possible that several such maximal lotteries exist, as a result of ties. However, the maximal lottery is unique whenever the number of voters is odd. By the same argument, the bipartisan set is uniquely defined by taking the support of the unique maximal lottery that solves a tournament game.

== Strategic interpretation ==
Maximal lotteries are equivalent to mixed maximin strategies (or Nash equilibria) of the symmetric zero-sum game given by the pairwise majority margins. As such, they have a natural interpretation in terms of electoral competition between two political parties and can be computed in polynomial time via linear programming.

== Example ==
Suppose there are five voters who have the following preferences over three alternatives:

- 2 voters: $a\succ b\succ c$
- 2 voters: $b\succ c\succ a$
- 1 voter: $c\succ a\succ b$

The pairwise preferences of the voters can be represented in the following skew-symmetric matrix, where the entry for row $x$ and column $y$ denotes the number of voters who prefer $x$ to $y$ minus the number of voters who prefer $y$ to $x$.

$$\begin{matrix}
\begin{matrix}
&  & a\quad & b\quad & c\quad \\
\end{matrix}
\\
\begin{matrix}
a\\
b\\
c\\
\end{matrix}
\begin{pmatrix}
0 & 1 & -1\\
-1 & 0 & 3\\
1 & -3 & 0\\
\end{pmatrix}
\end{matrix}$$

This matrix can be interpreted as a zero-sum game and admits a unique Nash equilibrium (or minimax strategy) $p$ where $p(a)=3/5$, $p(b)=1/5$, $p(c)=1/5$. By definition, this is also the unique maximal lottery of the preference profile above. The example was carefully chosen not to have a Condorcet winner. Many preference profiles admit a Condorcet winner, in which case the unique maximal lottery will assign probability 1 to the Condorcet winner. If the last voter in the example above swaps alternatives $a$ and $c$ in his preference relation, $a$ becomes the Condorcet winner and will be selected with probability 1.
