= Reversal symmetry =

Electoral system criterion

The reversal symmetry criterion is a voting system criterion which says that if every voter's opinions on each of the candidates is perfectly reversed (i.e. they rank candidates in order from worst to best), the outcome of the election should be reversed as well, i.e. the first- and last-place finishers should switch places. In other words, the results of the election should not depend arbitrarily on whether voters rank candidates from best to worst (and then select the best candidate), or whether we ask them to rank candidates from worst to best (and then select the least-bad candidate).

Another, equivalent way to motivate the criterion is to say that a voting system should never elect the worst candidate, according to the method itself (as doing so suggests the method is, in some sense, self-contradictory). The worst candidate can be identified by reversing all ballots (to rank candidates from worst-to-best) and then running the algorithm to find a single worst candidate.

Situations where the same candidate is elected when all ballots are reversed are sometimes called best-is-worst paradoxes, and can occur in instant-runoff voting and minimax. Methods that satisfy reversal symmetry include the Borda count, ranked pairs, Kemeny–Young, and Schulze. Most rated voting systems, including approval and score voting, satisfy the criterion as well.

== Examples ==
=== Instant-runoff voting ===
Consider a preferential system where 11 voters express their preferences as:

- 5 voters prefer A then B then C
- 4 voters prefer B then C then A
- 2 voters prefer C then A then B

With the Borda count A would get 23 points (5×3+4×1+2×2), B would get 24 points, and C would get 19 points, so B would be elected. In instant-runoff, C would be eliminated in the first round and A would be elected in the second round by 7 votes to 4.

Now reversing the preferences:

- 5 voters prefer C then B then A
- 4 voters prefer A then C then B
- 2 voters prefer B then A then C

With the Borda count A would get 21 points (5×1+4×3+2×2), B would get 20 points, and C would get 25 points, so this time C would be elected. In instant-runoff, B would be eliminated in the first round and A would as before be elected in the second round, this time by 6 votes to 5.

=== Minimax ===
This example shows that the Minimax method violates the Reversal symmetry criterion. Assume four candidates A, B, C and D with 14 voters with the following preferences:

# of voters	Preferences
4	A > B > D > C
4	B > C > A > D
2	C > D > A > B
1	D > A > B > C
1	D > B > C > A
2	D > C > A > B

Since all preferences are strict rankings (no equals are present), all three Minimax methods (winning votes, margins and pairwise opposite) elect the same winners.

Now, the winners are determined for the normal and the reversed order.

==== Normal order ====
# of voters	Preferences
4	A > B > D > C
4	B > C > A > D
2	C > D > A > B
1	D > A > B > C
1	D > B > C > A
2	D > C > A > B

The results would be tabulated as follows:

Pairwise election results
		X			
		A	B	C	D
Y	A		[X] 5 [Y] 9	[X] 9 [Y] 5	[X] 6 [Y] 8
Y	B	[X] 9 [Y] 5		[X] 4 [Y] 10	[X] 6 [Y] 8
Y	C	[X] 5 [Y] 9	[X] 10 [Y] 4		[X] 8 [Y] 6
Y	D	[X] 8 [Y] 6	[X] 8 [Y] 6	[X] 6 [Y] 8	
Pairwise election results (won-tied-lost):		2-0-1	2-0-1	1-0-2	1-0-2
worst pairwise defeat (winning votes):		9	9	10	8
worst pairwise defeat (margins):		4	4	6	2
worst pairwise opposition:		9	9	10	8

- [X] indicates voters who preferred the candidate listed in the column caption to the candidate listed in the row caption
- [Y] indicates voters who preferred the candidate listed in the row caption to the candidate listed in the column caption

Result: The candidates A, B, and C form a cycle with clear defeats. D benefits from that since its two losses are relatively close and therefore D's biggest defeat is the closest of all candidates. Thus, D is elected Minimax winner.

==== Reversed order ====
# of voters	Preferences
4	C > D > B > A
4	D > A > C > B
2	B > A > D > C
1	C > B > A > D
1	A > C > B > D
2	B > A > C > D

The results would be tabulated as follows:

Pairwise election results
		X			
		A	B	C	D
Y	A		[X] 9 [Y] 5	[X] 5 [Y] 9	[X] 8 [Y] 6
Y	B	[X] 5 [Y] 9		[X] 10 [Y] 4	[X] 8 [Y] 6
Y	C	[X] 9 [Y] 5	[X] 4 [Y] 10		[X] 6 [Y] 8
Y	D	[X] 6 [Y] 8	[X] 6 [Y] 8	[X] 8 [Y] 6	
Pairwise election results (won-tied-lost):		1-0-2	1-0-2	2-0-1	2-0-1
worst pairwise defeat (winning votes):		9	10	9	8
worst pairwise defeat (margins):		4	6	4	2
worst pairwise opposition:		9	10	9	8

Result: The candidates A, B, and C still form a cycle with clear defeats. Therefore D's biggest defeat is the closest of all candidates, and D is elected Minimax winner.

==== Conclusion ====
D is the Minimax winner using the normal preference order and also using the ballots with reversed preference orders. Thus, Minimax fails the reversal symmetry criterion.

=== Plurality voting ===
This example shows that plurality voting violates the Reversal symmetry criterion. Assume three candidates A, B and C and 4 voters with the following preferences:

# of voters	Preferences
1	A > B > C
1	C > B > A
1	B > A > C
1	C > A > B

Note that reversing all the ballots, leads to the same set of ballots, since the reversed preference order of the first voter resembles the preference order of the second, and similarly with the third and fourth.

In the following the Plurality winner is determined. Plurality ballots only contain the single favorite:

# of voters	Favorite
1	A
1	B
2	C

Result: The candidates A and B receive 1 vote each, candidate C receives a plurality of 2 votes (50%). Thus, C is elected Plurality winner.

C is the Plurality winner using the normal ballots and also using the reversed ballot. Thus, Plurality fails the reversal symmetry criterion.

Note that every voting system that satisfies the reversal symmetry criterion would have to lead to a tie in this example (as in every example in which the set of reversed ballots is the same as the set of normal ballots).

=== STAR voting ===
This example shows STAR violates the reversal symmetry criterion. In a score ballot, reversed score is calculated as the maximum possible score minus the normal score.

==== Normal score ====
Given a 3-candidate election between candidates A, B, and C:

Candidate	Ballots				
A	5	5	2	2	2
B	0	0	3	3	3
C	1	1	2	0	4

The results are tabulated below:

Candidate	Total Score	Preferred vs		
Candidate	Total Score	A	B	C
A	16	--	2	3
B	9	3	--	2
C	8	1	3	--

Result: In the election, candidates A and B have the highest scores, and advance to the runoff round. B wins being preferred over A 3 votes to 2.

==== Reversed score ====
Reversing the ballots by subtracting each score from 5 (the maximum score in STAR) gives the following:

Candidate	Ballots				
A	0	0	3	3	3
B	5	5	2	2	2
C	4	4	3	5	1

The results are tabulated below:

Candidate	Total Score	Preferred vs		
Candidate	Total Score	A	B	C
A	9	--	3	1
B	16	2	--	3
C	17	3	2	--

Result: In the reversed ballots, B and C have the highest total score, and B wins being preferred to C 3 votes to 2.
