= Kingman Hall =

Building in Berkeley, California, United States

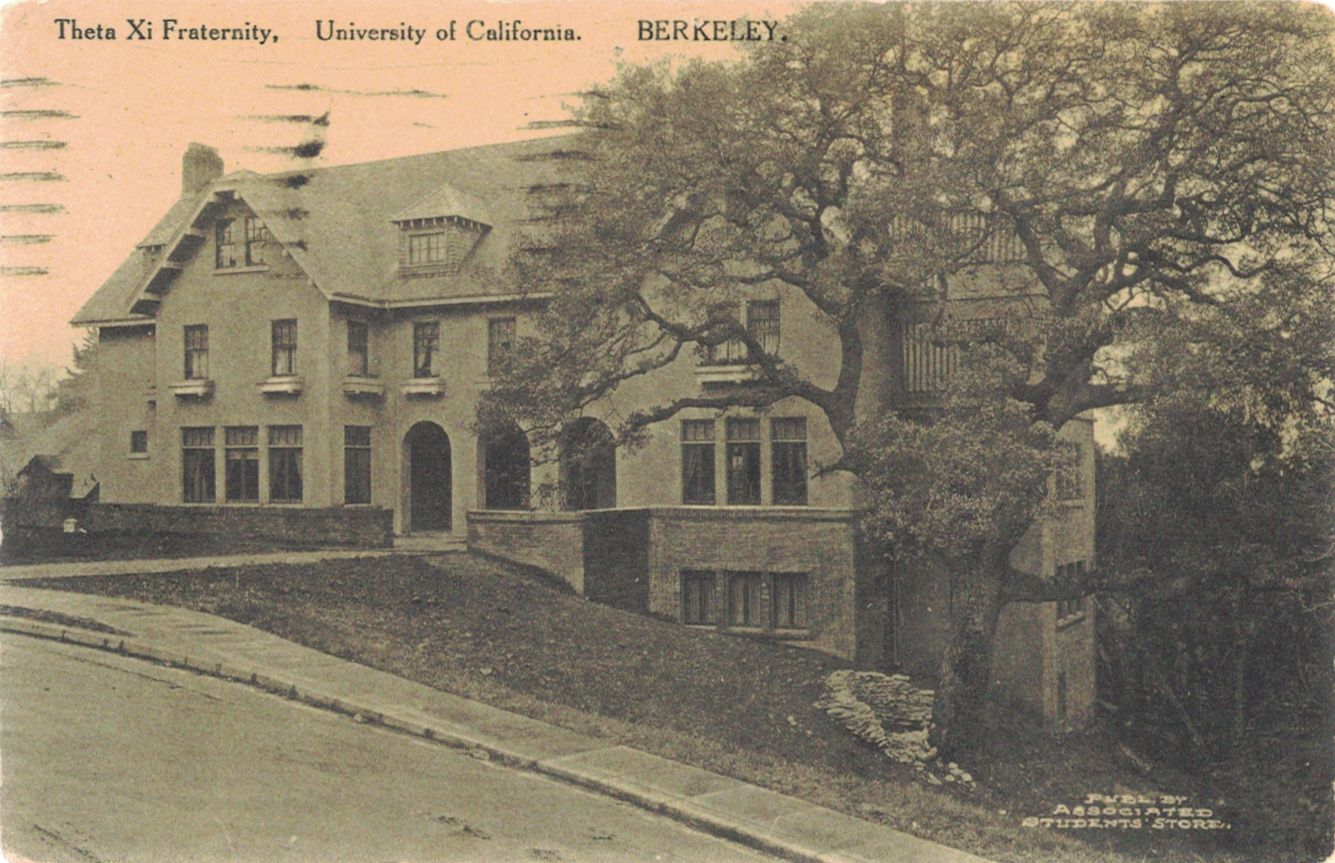
- Interactive map of the Kingman Hall area

General information
- Location: 1730 La Loma Avenue, Berkeley, California
- Coordinates: 37°52′37″N 122°15′27″W
- Completed: 1914

Design and construction
- Architects: Charles W. Drysdale and Harry A. Thomsen, Jr

Berkeley Landmark
- Designated: January 4, 1999
- Reference no.: 214

Housing
- Interactive map of Housing

General information
- Category: Student housing cooperative
- Population: 50 residents (2020)
- No. of units: 11 Singles - 18 Doubles - 1 Triple

Other information
- Governing body: Berkeley Student Cooperative

Kingman Hall is located at 1730 La Loma Avenue near the northeast corner of the University of California, Berkeley campus. As part of the Berkeley Student Cooperative, Kingman Hall houses 50 residents, known as Kingmanites or Toadies. It is named after Harry Kingman, the former YMCA director who in 1933 inspired 14 students to start a student cooperative. The house was designated a City of Berkeley Landmark in January 1999.

== History ==
The house at 1730 La Loma Avenue was designed by the San Francisco architects Charles Drysdale and Harry Thomsen, Jr. It was built in 1914 as a chapter house for the Theta Xi engineering fraternity for $27,000 by Barry Building Co. of Oakland. The building survived the devastating 1923 Berkeley Fire, which burned close to 600 buildings north of the Berkeley campus. The Nu chapter of Theta Xi resided there until 1964, when the fraternity was disbanded owing to anti-Greek sentiment on the Berkeley campus. (Note: The Berkeley chapter was re-established in 1977.)

The house was almost sold to developers as a site for high-rise apartments, but instead embarked on a more bizarre career. In 1964 it became known as Toad Hall and served as a rooming house for male students. In 1969, it was purchased by a Hayward attorney named Harold Mefford, who made it co-ed and also rented it out to non-students. The house reportedly functioned more as a commune than a rooming house. One of the residents was Joy, Country Joe McDonald's personal secretary, who lived in a basement room. Author/Merry Prankster Ken Kesey (not to be confused with author/future owner Ken Keyes, Jr.) and musician David Crosby used to buy their drugs from a Toad Hall dealer, with their cars often seen parked in front of the house. During this period, Toad Hall was considered by some as the epicenter of Berkeley counterculture.

In 1973, Mefford sold the building for $127,000, to Ken Keyes, Jr., author of Living Love – a Way to Higher Consciousness and the building became the Berkeley Living Love Center. "The Living Love Way" was disseminated via broadcasts on KQED-FM every Saturday evening. A 52-hour morning-noon-and-night group workshop, designed by Keyes, offered the opportunity for a breakthrough toward higher consciousness. The center's brochure stated:

We use simple living arrangements in which the participants of the Intensive sleep on a carpeted floor of a large room. The morning breathing exercises are done without clothing. We suggest that you bring a blanket or sleeping bag, a towel, toilet articles, and simple clothing. We request no drugs be brought into the Center, and that there be no sexual activity during the Friday through Sunday period of the Intensive.

The center claimed tax exemption as a religious organization and operated on a non-profit basis. As with the house under Mefford, Toad Hall was a major irritant to its neighbors, and complaints were regularly filed with the city. In 1976, the center approached the city of Berkeley with an offer to donate the property for park use, if it could be determined that it was located on the Hayward Fault line. They felt it would be a violation of the "Law of Higher Consciousness" to simply sell the property to someone else. This fell through and the building was sold in 1977 to Berkeley Student Cooperative (BSC) for $300,000. The Living Love Center relocated to a 115-acre (0.47 km^{2}) farm-university in St. Mary, Kentucky. After its purchase, the house was renamed Kingman Hall, after Harry L. Kingman, director of the local University YMCA who encouraged BSC founders to start the cooperative in 1933.

== Housing Cooperative ==
Kingman Hall is part of the Berkeley Student Cooperative (BSC) a student housing cooperative serving primarily UC Berkeley students, but also open to any full-time post-secondary student. There are approximately 1,300 members in 17 houses and three apartment buildings. Kingman Hall houses 50 students and there are 30 units - 11 singles, 18 doubles and one triple. In addition there is a restaurant sized kitchen, a large dining room, as well as a roof deck and an outdoor amphitheater. There is a requirement for each member to provide a five hour work shift each week. Council meetings are held every week, with decisions made through a majority vote.

== Landmark status ==
In 1998–1999, in response to the residents' application to construct a deck on the roof of the building, the neighbors sought landmark designation for the building by the city's Designation Commission. The neighbors were successful and the house was designated a landmark with the commission denying Kingman's permit application. As a response Kingman appealed to the Berkeley City Council and was successful. The permit was issued with use restrictions, resulting in the deck being built. Under the restrictions Kingman residents are not allowed to use the deck after 9 pm.

== Gallery ==
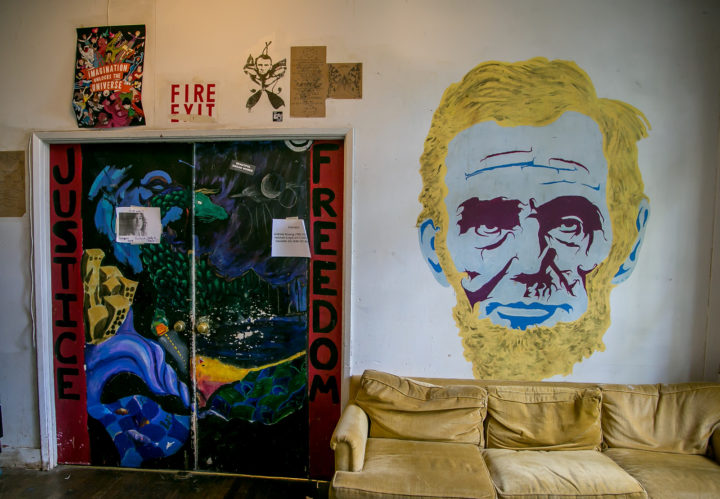

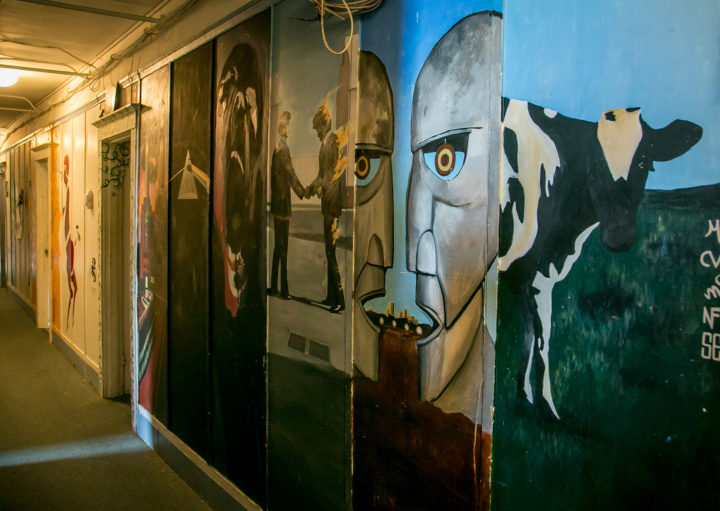

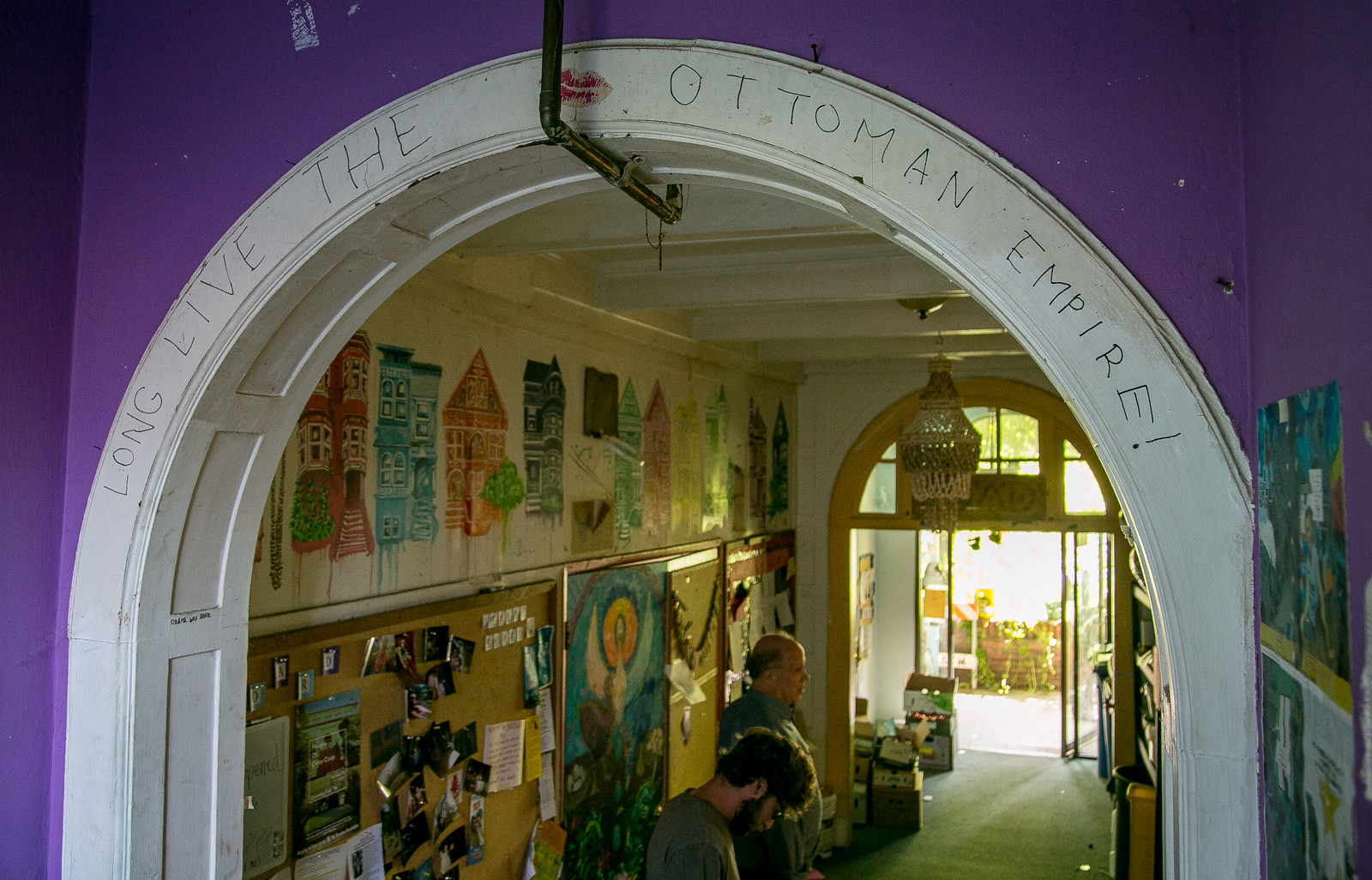

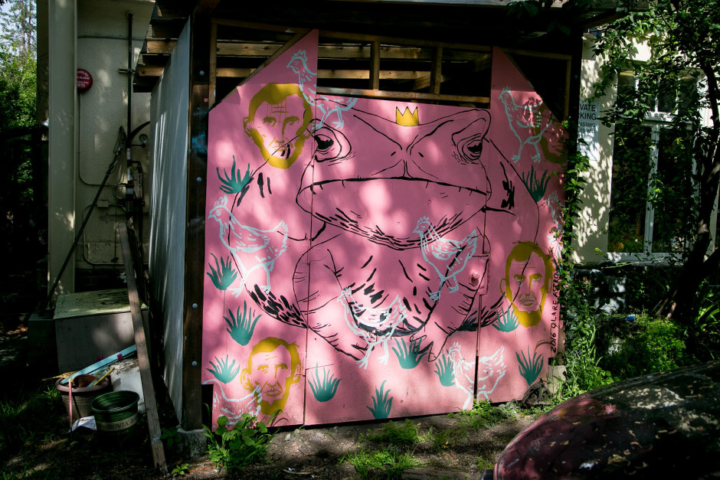

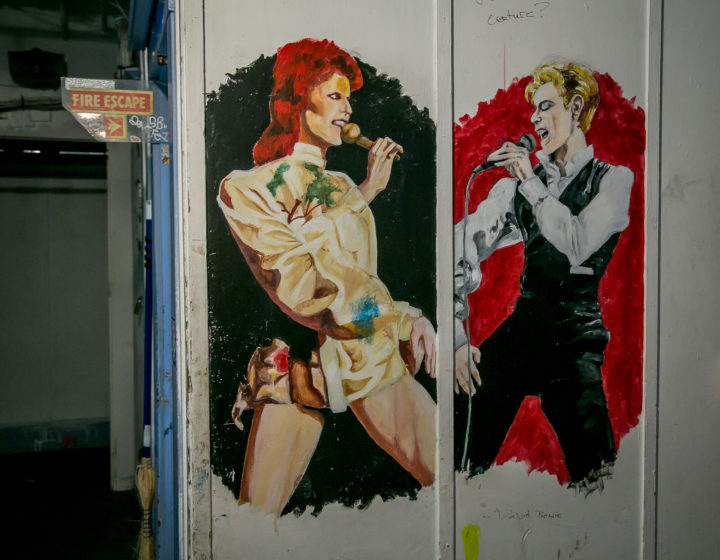

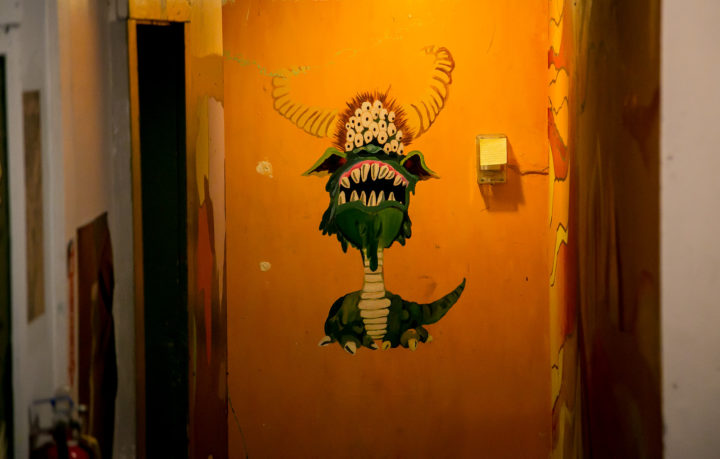

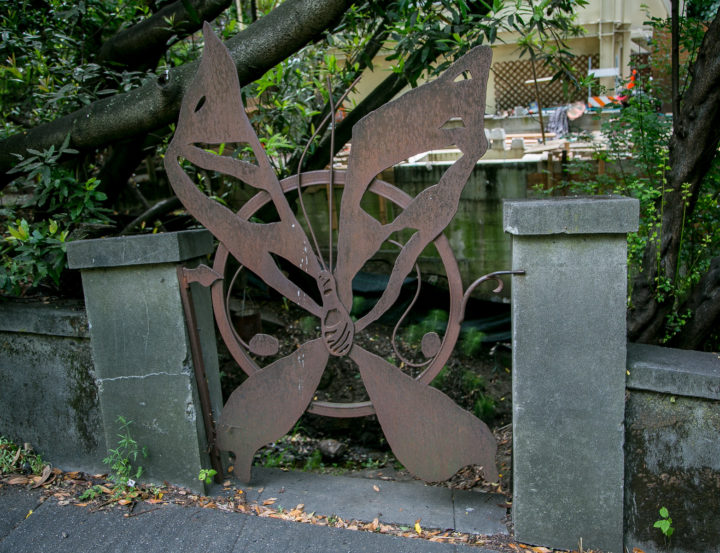
