= Landau set =

Generalized Condorcet set

In the study of electoral systems, the uncovered set (also called the Landau set or the Fishburn set) is a set of candidates that generalizes the notion of a Condorcet winner whenever there is a Condorcet paradox. The Landau set can be thought of as the Pareto frontier for a set of candidates, when the frontier is determined by pairwise victories.

The Landau set is a nonempty subset of the Smith set. It was first discovered by Nicholas Miller.

The Landau set consists of all undominated or uncovered candidates. One candidate (the Fishburn winner) is said to cover another (the Fishburn loser) if they would win any matchup the Fishburn loser would win. Thus, the Fishburn winner has all the pairwise victories of the Fishburn loser, and also at least one other pairwise victory.
