= Consistency criterion =

Property of electoral systems

A voting system satisfies join-consistency (also called the reinforcement criterion) if combining two sets of votes, both electing A over B, always results in a combined electorate that ranks A over B. It is a stronger form of the participation criterion. Systems that fail the consistency criterion (such as instant-runoff voting or Condorcet methods) are susceptible to the multiple-district paradox, a pathological behavior where a candidate can win an election without carrying even a single precinct. Conversely, it can be seen as allowing for a particularly egregious kind of gerrymander: it is possible to draw boundaries in such a way that a candidate who wins the overall election fails to carry even a single electoral district.

Rules susceptible to the multiple-districts paradox include all Condorcet methods and instant-runoff (or ranked-choice) voting. Rules that are not susceptible to it include all positional voting rules (such as first-preference plurality and the Borda count) as well as score voting and approval voting.

== Variants ==
There are three variants of join-consistency:

1. Winner-consistency—if two districts elect the same winner A, A also wins in a new district formed by combining the two.
2. Ranking-consistency—if two districts rank a set of candidates exactly the same way, then the combined district returns the same ranking of all candidates.
3. Grading-consistency—if two districts assign a candidate the same overall grade, then the combined district assigns that candidate the same grade.

A voting system is winner-consistent if and only if it is a point-summing method; in other words, it must be a positional voting system or score voting (including approval voting).

As shown below for the Kemeny rule and majority judgment, these three variants do not always agree with each other (which contrasts with most other voting criteria). Kemeny is the only ranking-consistent Condorcet method, and no Condorcet method can be winner-consistent.

== Examples ==
=== Copeland ===
This example shows that Copeland's method violates the consistency criterion. Assume five candidates A, B, C, D and E with 27 voters with the following preferences:

Preferences	Voters
A > D > B > E > C	3
A > D > E > C > B	2
B > A > C > D > E	3
C > D > B > E > A	3
E > C > B > A > D	3
A > D > C > E > B	3
A > D > E > B > C	1
B > D > C > E > A	3
C > A > B > D > E	3
E > B > C > A > D	3

Now, the set of all voters is divided into two groups at the bold line. The voters over the line are the first group of voters; the others are the second group of voters.

==== First group of voters ====
In the following the Copeland winner for the first group of voters is determined.

Preferences	Voters
A > D > B > E > C	3
A > D > E > C > B	2
B > A > C > D > E	3
C > D > B > E > A	3
E > C > B > A > D	3

The results would be tabulated as follows:

Pairwise preferences
X (Note: indicates voters who preferred the candidate listed in the column caption to the candidate listed in the row caption) Y (Note: indicates voters who preferred the candidate listed in the row caption to the candidate listed in the column caption)	A	B	C	D	E
A		9 5	6 8	3 11	6 8
B	5 9		8 6	8 6	5 9
C	8 6	6 8		5 9	8 6
D	11 3	6 8	9 5		3 11
E	8 6	9 5	6 8	11 3	
Pairwise election results (won-tied-lost)	3–0–1	2–0–2	2–0–2	2–0–2	1–0–3

Result: With the votes of the first group of voters, A can defeat three of the four opponents, whereas no other candidate wins against more than two opponents. Thus, A is elected Copeland winner by the first group of voters.

==== Second group of voters ====
Now, the Copeland winner for the second group of voters is determined.

Preferences	Voters
A > D > C > E > B	3
A > D > E > B > C	1
B > D > C > E > A	3
C > A > B > D > E	3
E > B > C > A > D	3

The results would be tabulated as follows:

Pairwise election results
X Y	A	B	C	D	E
A		6 7	9 4	3 10	6 7
B	7 6		6 7	4 9	7 6
C	4 9	7 6		7 6	4 9
D	10 3	9 4	6 7		3 10
E	7 6	6 7	9 4	10 3	
Pairwise election results (won-tied-lost)	3–0–1	2–0–2	2–0–2	2–0–2	1–0–3

Result: Taking only the votes of the second group in account, again, A can defeat three of the four opponents, whereas no other candidate wins against more than two opponents. Thus, A is elected Copeland winner by the second group of voters.

==== All voters ====
Finally, the Copeland winner of the complete set of voters is determined.

Preferences	Voters
A > D > B > E > C	3
A > D > C > E > B	3
A > D > E > B > C	1
A > D > E > C > B	2
B > A > C > D > E	3
B > D > C > E > A	3
C > A > B > D > E	3
C > D > B > E > A	3
E > B > C > A > D	3
E > C > B > A > D	3

The results would be tabulated as follows:

Pairwise election results
X Y	A	B	C	D	E
A		15 12	15 12	6 21	12 15
B	12 15		14 13	12 15	12 15
C	12 15	13 14		12 15	12 15
D	21 6	15 12	15 12		6 21
E	15 12	15 12	15 12	21 6	
Pairwise election results (won-tied-lost)	2–0–2	3–0–1	4–0–0	1–0–3	0–0–4

Result: C is the Condorcet winner, thus Copeland chooses C as winner.

=== Instant-runoff voting ===
This example shows that Instant-runoff voting violates the consistency criterion. Assume three candidates A, B and C and 23 voters with the following preferences:

Preferences	Voters
A > B > C	4
B > A > C	2
C > B > A	4
A > B > C	4
B > A > C	6
C > A > B	3

Now, the set of all voters is divided into two groups at the bold line. The voters over the line are the first group of voters; the others are the second group of voters.

==== First group of voters ====
In the following the instant-runoff winner for the first group of voters is determined.

Preferences	Voters
A > B > C	4
B > A > C	2
C > B > A	4

B has only 2 votes and is eliminated first. Its votes are transferred to A. Now, A has 6 votes and wins against C with 4 votes.

Candidate	Votes in round	
Candidate	1st	2nd
A	4	6
B	2	
C	4	4

Result: A wins against C, after B has been eliminated.

==== Second group of voters ====
Now, the instant-runoff winner for the second group of voters is determined.

Preferences	Voters
A > B > C	4
B > A > C	6
C > A > B	3

C has the fewest votes, a count of 3, and is eliminated. A benefits from that, gathering all the votes from C. Now, with 7 votes A wins against B with 6 votes.

Candidate	Votes in round	
Candidate	1st	2nd
A	4	7
B	6	6
C	3	

Result: A wins against B, after C has been eliminated.

==== All voters ====
Finally, the instant runoff winner of the complete set of voters is determined.

Preferences	Voters
A > B > C	8
B > A > C	8
C > A > B	3
C > B > A	4

C has the fewest first preferences and so is eliminated first, its votes are split: 4 are transferred to B and 3 to A. Thus, B wins with 12 votes against 11 votes of A.

Candidate	Votes in round	
Candidate	1st	2nd
A	8	11
B	8	12
C	7	

Result: B wins against A, after C is eliminated.

==== Conclusion ====
A is the instant-runoff winner within the first group of voters and also within the second group of voters. However, both groups combined elect B as the instant-runoff winner. Thus, instant-runoff voting fails the consistency criterion.

=== Kemeny method ===
This example shows that the Kemeny method violates the consistency criterion. Assume three candidates A, B and C and 38 voters with the following preferences:

Group	Preferences	Voters
1st	A > B > C	7
1st	B > C > A	6
1st	C > A > B	3
2nd	A > C > B	8
2nd	B > A > C	7
2nd	C > B > A	7

Now, the set of all voters is divided into two groups at the bold line. The voters over the line are the first group of voters; the others are the second group of voters.

==== First group of voters ====
In the following the Kemeny winner for the first group of voters is determined.

Preferences	Voters
A > B > C	7
B > C > A	6
C > A > B	3

The Kemeny method arranges the pairwise comparison counts in the following tally table:

Pairs of choices		Voters who prefer		
X	Y	X over Y	Neither	Y over X
A	B	10	0	6
A	C	7	0	9
B	C	13	0	3

The ranking scores of all possible rankings are:

Preferences	1 vs 2	1 vs 3	2 vs 3	Total
A > B > C	10	7	13	30
A > C > B	7	10	3	20
B > A > C	6	13	7	26
B > C > A	13	6	9	28
C > A > B	9	3	10	22
C > B > A	3	9	6	18

Result: The ranking A > B > C has the highest ranking score. Thus, A wins ahead of B and C.

==== Second group of voters ====
Now, the Kemeny winner for the second group of voters is determined.

Preferences	Voters
A > C > B	8
B > A > C	7
C > B > A	7

The Kemeny method arranges the pairwise comparison counts in the following tally table:

Pairs of choices		Voters who prefer		
X	Y	X over Y	Neither	Y over X
A	B	8	0	14
A	C	15	0	7
B	C	7	0	15

The ranking scores of all possible rankings are:

Preferences	1 vs 2	1 vs 3	2 vs 3	Total
A > B > C	8	15	7	30
A > C > B	15	8	15	38
B > A > C	14	7	15	36
B > C > A	7	14	7	28
C > A > B	7	15	8	30
C > B > A	15	7	14	36

Result: The ranking A > C > B has the highest ranking score. Hence, A wins ahead of C and B.

==== All voters ====
Finally, the Kemeny winner of the complete set of voters is determined.

Preferences	Voters
A > B > C	7
A > C > B	8
B > A > C	7
B > C > A	6
C > A > B	3
C > B > A	7

The Kemeny method arranges the pairwise comparison counts in the following tally table:

Pairs of choices		Voters who prefer		
X	Y	X over Y	Neither	Y over X
A	B	18	0	20
A	C	22	0	16
B	C	20	0	18

The ranking scores of all possible rankings are:

Preferences	1 vs 2	1 vs 3	2 vs 3	Total
A > B > C	18	22	20	60
A > C > B	22	18	18	58
B > A > C	20	20	22	62
B > C > A	20	20	16	56
C > A > B	16	18	18	52
C > B > A	18	16	20	54

Result: The ranking B > A > C has the highest ranking score. So, B wins ahead of A and C.

==== Conclusion ====
A is the Kemeny winner within the first group of voters and also within the second group of voters. However, both groups combined elect B as the Kemeny winner. Thus, the Kemeny method fails the reinforcement criterion.

==== Ranking consistency ====
The Kemeny method satisfies ranking consistency; that is, if the electorate is divided arbitrarily into two parts and separate elections in each part result in the same ranking being selected, an election of the entire electorate also selects that ranking. In fact, it is the only Condorcet method that satisfies ranking consistency.

===== Informal proof =====
The Kemeny score of a ranking $\mathcal{R}$ is computed by summing up the number of pairwise comparisons on each ballot that match the ranking $\mathcal{R}$. Thus, the Kemeny score $s_V(\mathcal{R})$ for an electorate $V$ can be computed by separating the electorate into disjoint subsets $V = V_1 \cup V_2$ (with $V_1 \cap V_2 = \emptyset$), computing the Kemeny scores for these subsets and adding it up:

$$\text{(I)} \quad s_V(\mathcal{R}) = s_{V_1}(\mathcal{R}) + s_{V_2}(\mathcal{R})$$.

Now, consider an election with electorate $V$. The premise of reinforcement is to divide the electorate arbitrarily into two parts $V = V_1 \cup V_2$, and in each part the same ranking $\mathcal{R}$ is selected. This means, that the Kemeny score for the ranking $\mathcal{R}$ in each electorate is bigger than for every other ranking $\mathcal{R}'$:

$$\begin{align}
\text{(II)} \quad \forall \mathcal{R}':{} &s_{V_1}(\mathcal{R}) > s_{V_1}(\mathcal{R}') \\
\text{(III)} \quad \forall \mathcal{R}':{} &s_{V_2}(\mathcal{R}) > s_{V_2}(\mathcal{R}')
\end{align}$$

Now, it has to be shown, that the Kemeny score of the ranking $\mathcal{R}$ in the entire electorate is bigger than the Kemeny score of every other ranking $\mathcal{R}'$:

$$s_V(\mathcal{R}) \ \stackrel{(I)}{=}\  s_{V_1}(\mathcal{R}) + s_{V_2}(\mathcal{R}) \ \stackrel{(II)}{>}\  s_{V_1}(\mathcal{R}') + s_{V_2}(\mathcal{R}) \ \stackrel{(III)}{>}\  s_{V_1}(\mathcal{R}') + s_{V_2}(\mathcal{R}') \ \stackrel{(I)}{=}\  s_V(\mathcal{R}') \quad q.e.d.$$

Thus, the Kemeny method is consistent with respect to complete rankings.

=== Majority Judgment ===
This example shows that majority judgment violates reinforcement. Assume two candidates A and B and 10 voters with the following ratings:

Candidate		Voters
A	B	Voters
Excellent	Fair	3
Poor	Fair	2
Fair	Poor	3
Poor	Fair	2

Now, the set of all voters is divided into two groups at the bold line. The voters over the line are the first group of voters; the others are the second group of voters.

==== First group of voters ====
In the following the majority judgment winner for the first group of voters is determined.

Candidates		Voters
A	B	Voters
Excellent	Fair	3
Poor	Fair	2

The sorted ratings would be as follows:

Candidate

↓	Median point

A

B

Excellent Good Fair Poor

Result: With the votes of the first group of voters, A has the median rating of "Excellent" and B has the median rating of "Fair". Thus, A is elected majority judgment winner by the first group of voters.

==== Second group of voters ====
Now, the majority judgment winner for the second group of voters is determined.

Candidates		Voters
A	B	Voters
Fair	Poor	3
Poor	Fair	2

The sorted ratings would be as follows:

Candidate

↓	Median point

A

B

Excellent Good Fair Poor

Result: Taking only the votes of the second group in account, A has the median rating of "Fair" and B the median rating of "Poor". Thus, A is elected majority judgment winner by the second group of voters.

==== All voters ====
Finally, the majority judgment winner of the complete set of voters is determined.

Candidates		Voters
A	B	Voters
Excellent	Fair	3
Fair	Poor	3
Poor	Fair	4

The sorted ratings would be as follows:

Candidate

↓	Median point

A

B

Excellent Good Fair Poor

The median ratings for A and B are both "Fair". Since there is a tie, "Fair" ratings are removed from both, until their medians become different. After removing 20% "Fair" ratings from the votes of each, the sorted ratings are now:

Candidate	↓ / Median point
A
B

Result: Now, the median rating of A is "Poor" and the median rating of B is "Fair". Thus, B is elected majority judgment winner.

==== Conclusion ====
A is the majority judgment winner within the first group of voters and also within the second group of voters. However, both groups combined elect B as the Majority Judgment winner. Thus, Majority Judgment fails the consistency criterion.

=== Ranked Pairs ===
This example shows that the ranked pairs method violates the consistency criterion. Assume three candidates A, B and C with 39 voters with the following preferences:

Preferences	Voters
A > B > C	7
B > C > A	6
C > A > B	3
A > C > B	9
B > A > C	8
C > B > A	6

Now, the set of all voters is divided into two groups at the bold line. The voters over the line are the first group of voters; the others are the second group of voters.

==== First group of voters ====
In the following the ranked pairs winner for the first group of voters is determined.

Preferences	Voters
A > B > C	7
B > C > A	6
C > A > B	3

The results would be tabulated as follows:

Pairwise election results
X Y	A	B	C
A		6 10	9 7
B	10 6		3 13
C	7 9	13 3	
Pairwise election results (won-tied-lost)	1–0–1	1–0–1	1–0–1

The sorted list of victories would be:

Pair	Winner
B (13) vs C (3)	B 13
A (10) vs B (6)	A 10
A (7) vs C (9)	C 9

Result: B > C and A > B are locked in first (and C > A can't be locked in after that), so the full ranking is A > B > C. Thus, A is elected ranked pairs winner by the first group of voters.

==== Second group of voters ====
Now, the ranked pairs winner for the second group of voters is determined.

Preferences	Voters
A > C > B	9
B > A > C	8
C > B > A	6

The results would be tabulated as follows:

Pairwise election results
X Y	A	B	C
A		14 9	6 17
B	9 14		15 8
C	17 6	8 15	
Pairwise election results (won-tied-lost)	1–0–1	1–0–1	1–0–1

The sorted list of victories would be:

Pair	Winner
A (17) vs C (6)	A 17
B (8) vs C (15)	C 15
A (9) vs B (14)	B 14

Result: Taking only the votes of the second group in account, A > C and C > B are locked in first (and B > A can't be locked in after that), so the full ranking is A > C > B. Thus, A is elected ranked pairs winner by the second group of voters.

==== All voters ====
Finally, the ranked pairs winner of the complete set of voters is determined.

Preferences	Voters
A > B > C	7
A > C > B	9
B > A > C	8
B > C > A	6
C > A > B	3
C > B > A	6

The results would be tabulated as follows:

Pairwise election results
X Y	A	B	C
A		20 19	15 24
B	19 20		18 21
C	24 15	21 18	
Pairwise election results (won-tied-lost)	1–0–1	2–0–0	0–0–2

The sorted list of victories would be:

Pair	Winner
A (25) vs C (15)	A 24
B (21) vs C (18)	B 21
A (19) vs B (20)	B 20

Result: Now, all three pairs (A > C, B > C and B > A) can be locked in without a cycle. The full ranking is B > A > C. Thus, ranked pairs chooses B as winner, which is the Condorcet winner, due to the lack of a cycle.

==== Conclusion ====
A is the ranked pairs winner within the first group of voters and also within the second group of voters. However, both groups combined elect B as the ranked pairs winner. Thus, the ranked pairs method fails the consistency criterion.
