= May's theorem =

Social choice theorem on superiority of majority voting

In social choice theory, May's theorem, also called the general possibility theorem, says that majority vote is the unique ranked social choice function between two candidates that satisfies the following criteria:

- Anonymity: the decision rule treats each voter identically (one vote, one value). Who casts a vote makes no difference; the voter's identity need not be disclosed.
- Neutrality: the decision rule treats each alternative or candidate equally (a free and fair election).
- Decisiveness: if the vote is tied, adding a single voter (who expresses an opinion) will break the tie.
- Positive response: If a voter changes a preference, MR never switches the outcome against that voter. If the outcome the voter now prefers would have won, it still does so.
- Ordinality: the decision rule relies only on which of two outcomes a voter prefers, not how much.
  - This can be replaced by strategyproofness, i.e. every person's dominant strategy is to honestly disclose their preferences.

The theorem was first published by Kenneth May in 1952.

Various modifications have been suggested by others since the original publication. If rated voting is allowed, a wide variety of rules satisfy May's conditions, including score voting or highest median voting rules.

Arrow's theorem does not apply to the case of two candidates (when there are trivially no "independent alternatives"), so this possibility result can be seen as the mirror analogue of that theorem. Note that anonymity is a stronger requirement than Arrow's non-dictatorship.

Another way of explaining the fact that simple majority voting can successfully deal with at most two alternatives is to cite Nakamura's theorem. The theorem states that the number of alternatives that a rule can deal with successfully is less than the Nakamura number of the rule. The Nakamura number of simple majority voting is 3, except in the case of four voters. Supermajority rules may have greater Nakamura numbers.

== Formal statement ==
Let A and B be two possible choices, often called alternatives or candidates. A preference is then simply a choice of whether A, B, or neither is preferred. Denote the set of preferences by {A, B, 0}, where 0 represents neither.

Let N be a positive integer. In this context, a ordinal (ranked) social choice function is a function

$$F : \{A,B,0\}^N \to \{A,B,0\}$$

which aggregates individuals' preferences into a single preference. An N-tuple (R_{1}, …, R_{N}) ∈ {A, B, 0}^{N} of voters' preferences is called a preference profile.

Define a social choice function called simple majority voting as follows:

- If the number of preferences for A is greater than the number of preferences for B, simple majority voting returns A,
- If the number of preferences for A is less than the number of preferences for B, simple majority voting returns B,
- If the number of preferences for A is equal to the number of preferences for B, simple majority voting returns 0.

May's theorem states that simple majority voting is the unique social welfare function satisfying all three of the following conditions:

1. Anonymity: The social choice function treats all voters the same, i.e. permuting the order of the voters does not change the result.
2. Neutrality: The social choice function treats all outcomes the same, i.e. permuting the order of the outcomes does not change the result.
3. Positive responsiveness: If the social choice was indifferent between A and B, but a voter who previously preferred B changes their preference to A, then the social choice becomes A.

== See also ==
- Social choice theory
- Arrow's impossibility theorem
- Condorcet paradox
- Gibbard–Satterthwaite theorem
- Gibbard's theorem

== Notes ==
1. May, Kenneth O. 1952. "A set of independent necessary and sufficient conditions for simple majority decisions", Econometrica, Vol. 20, Issue 4, pp. 680–684. JSTOR 1907651
2. Mark Fey, "May’s Theorem with an Infinite Population", Social Choice and Welfare, 2004, Vol. 23, issue 2, pages 275–293.
3. Goodin, Robert and Christian List (2006). "A conditional defense of plurality rule: generalizing May's theorem in a restricted informational environment," American Journal of Political Science, Vol. 50, issue 4, pages 940-949. doi:10.1111/j.1540-5907.2006.00225.x
