= Bullet voting =

Vote supporting only a single candidate

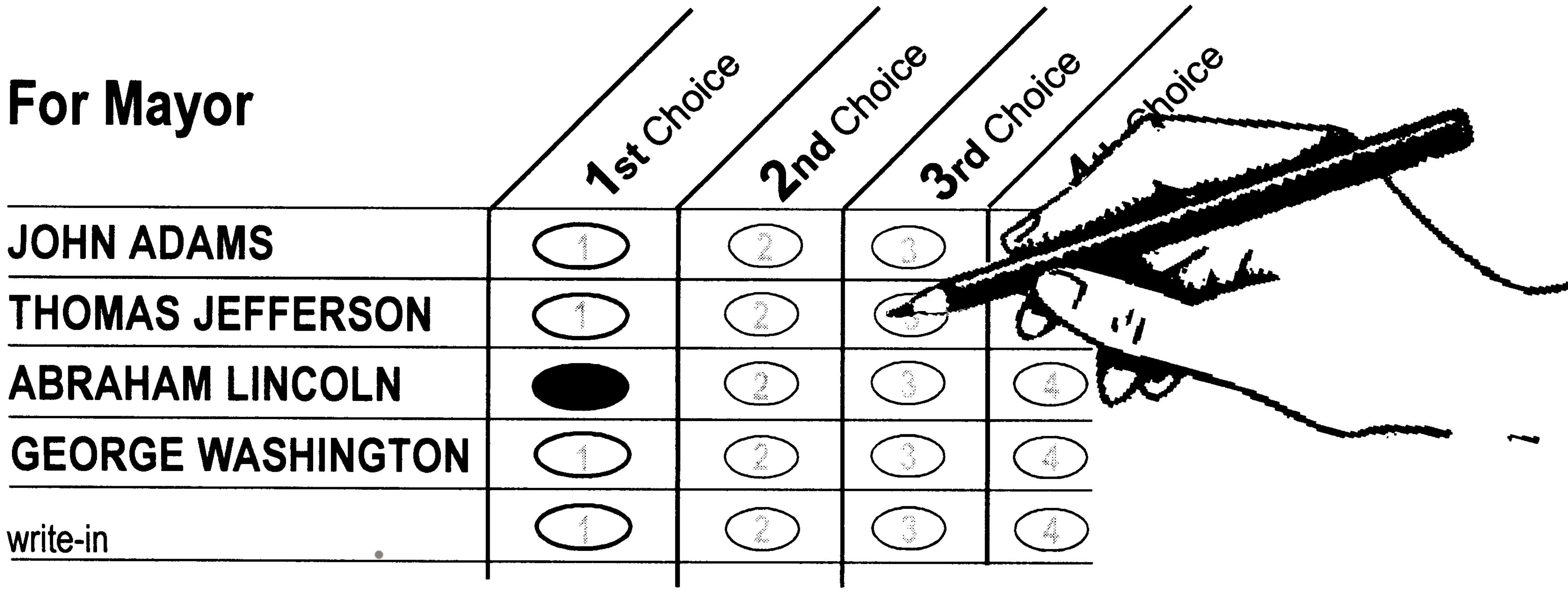
A voter marking a ballot for a single favorite candidate

Bullet, single-shot, or plump voting is when a voter supports only a single candidate, typically to show strong support for a single favorite.

Every voting method that does not satisfy either later-no-harm (most methods) or monotonicity (such as instant-runoff voting) will encourage bullet voting or truncation in some situations.

In systems that fail later-no-harm, voters who feel strongly about their favorite candidate can use bullet voting to maximize the chances their favorite candidate will be elected, at the cost of reducing the chances that one of their later preferences will win.

In non-participatory systems (such as instant-runoff), voters can sometimes strategically bullet-vote to hide their support for additional candidates; this strategy works because such systems can cause candidates to lose when they receive too much support from voters.

Setups where voters may benefit from truncating their ballots are sometimes called a truncation paradox or Burr dilemma. This name comes from Aaron Burr, who tied with Thomas Jefferson in the Electoral College during the 1800 election after one Jefferson-Burr elector forgot to truncate their block plurality ballot to exclude Burr. The resulting tie nearly caused a constitutional crisis.

In systems like cumulative voting, bullet voting is actively encouraged as a way for minority groups to achieve proportional representation, by allowing small groups to concentrate all their support on one candidate and win at least one seat on a city council. During the Jim Crow era, municipalities often banned or disparaged bullet voting in an attempt to prevent black voters from being able to achieve representation on city councils, creating a stigma that in some cases lasts to the present day.

== Single winner elections ==
=== Plurality ===
First-preference plurality is usually modeled as a ranked voting system where voters can rank as many candidates as they like, and the candidate with the most first-preference votes wins. As a result, plurality is "immune" to bullet voting or truncation as a strategy, but only by making every vote equivalent to a bullet vote.

=== Instant-runoff ===
Contrary to a common misconception, later-no-harm systems like instant-runoff are not immune to truncation, unless they satisfy the participation criterion as well; because instant-runoff fails participation, it encourages bullet voting or truncation in some circumstances.

Graham-Squire and McCune note that instant-runoff can suffer from an especially severe kind of strategic truncation, stronger than bullet voting, where voters cannot safely rank any candidates at all; such a situation is called a no-show paradox. A 2021 study found roughly 32% of voters under instant-runoff cast bullet-votes, although it suggested this had more to do with convenience than with strategic incentives.

=== Cardinal voting ===
By contrast, in approval and score voting, bullet voting can be fairly common for voters who only feel one candidate adequately represents them. However, because approval satisfies no favorite betrayal, such voting is not deceptive (in other words, it accurately reflects a voter's honest ordering of candidates). In general, the optimal strategy for an approval voter is to approve of all above-average candidates, i.e. all candidates whose quality is higher than the expected value of the winner.

Traditional Bucklin voting was infamous for its high vulnerability to bullet voting, due to its use of ranked ballots; however, Balinski and Laraki showed in their study of highest median rules that this can be fixed by using rated ballots, which allow voters to skip ratings to show weak support for a candidate.

== Multiple winner elections ==
N seat elections
System	Votes
Approval voting Range voting Borda voting	Point scores
Plurality-at-large voting	N
Limited voting	N-1; N-2...
Single non-transferable vote (Whole vote)	1
Instant-runoff voting (Whole vote)	1
Cumulative voting (Explicit divided vote)	1
Single transferable vote (Implicit divided vote)	1

Multiple votes are often allowed in elections with more than one winner. Bullet voting can help a first choice be elected, depending on the system:

Multiple non-transferable vote methods

- Approval voting used in a multi-winner election works the same way as Plurality-at-large but allows more votes than winners. This results in a body that is less representative than a body elected under a proportional voting method but would still have the same ideological center as the population. 100% bullet voting under Approval Voting in a multi-winner election is unlikely, as voters are incentivized to vote for acceptable moderates in addition to their favorite candidates to avoid being locked out of the election entirely.
  - Range voting is a generalization of Approval voting where voters can give gradations of support for each candidate. Here bullet voting refers to providing 100% support for one candidate and 0% for all other candidates, just like Approval bullet voting.
  - Borda voting assign multiple votes based on ranked ballots, like three votes for the first, two for the second, and one for the third choice. This encourages minority voters to bullet vote (not using all the rankings). If voters are required to rank all the candidates, it further encourages voters to (insincerely) bury strongest rivals at the lowest rankings.
- Plurality-at-large voting (Bloc-voting) allows up to N votes for elections with N winner elections. In this system, a voter who prefers a single candidate and is concerned his candidate will lose has a strong incentive to bullet vote to avoid a second choice helping to eliminate the first choice. A united majority of voters in plurality-at-large can control all the winners despite any strategic bullet voting by a united minority.

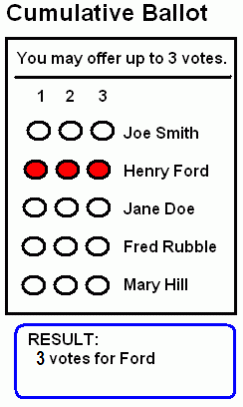
Bullet voting in Cumulative voting allows multiple votes for one candidate.

Limited-Vote Systems

- A single nontransferable vote limits everyone to one vote, effectively making bullet voting mandatory, minimizing the power of a majority of voters to pick all the winners, and can work well if there are only a few more candidates as winners.
- Cumulative voting allows up to N votes for N winner elections which can be distributed between multiple candidates or all given to one candidate. Effectively, this is one vote which can be fractionally divided among more than one candidate. This removes any penalty to bullet voters, who support a single candidate, and it enables the possibility of a united minority to elect at least one winner despite a united majority voting for all other candidates.
- Single transferable vote removes the incentive for sincere strategic bullet voting, since lower rankings are only used later (after higher choices have been elected or eliminated). However, it creates an incentive for insincere bullet voting in situations where adding additional preferences would hurt later candidates; in some situations, adding a later preference can cause that later-preference candidate to lose.

== Burr dilemma ==
The Burr dilemma is a particular case in which bullet voting was considered. The term was used in The Journal of Politics (2007) by Jack H. Nagel, who named it after Aaron Burr, who initially tied with Thomas Jefferson for Electoral College votes in the United States presidential election of 1800. According to Nagel, the electoral tie resulted from "a strategic tension built into approval voting, which forces two leaders appealing to the same voters to play a game of Chicken."

The Burr dilemma takes its name from the 1800 United States presidential election, which was conducted using a voting-rule similar to approval voting, though not quite identical. Each member of the Electoral College was required to vote for two candidates, with the candidate with the most votes becoming president, and the one with the second-most becoming vice-president.

In this election, the Democratic-Republicans preferred Jefferson and Burr, and faced a unified opposition (the supporters of Adams). The presence of two candidates on one side and one on the other, along with the double vote, led to a dilemma:

- If a Republican voter were to support both Jefferson and Burr, they would effectively cast no votes because they do not make a distinction between the top two candidates. If most Republicans support both, the election is also a near-tie, with the outcome being determined essentially by chance.
- On the other hand, if too many electors were to vote only for Jefferson or only for Burr, Adams will be elected.

The Democratic-Republicans held a majority in the Electoral College that year, with 73 electors versus only 65 Federalists. The electors of the two biggest Republican states were instructed to vote for both Jefferson and Burr, with the intention of securing both the Presidency and the Vice-Presidency for their party, and other electors, perceiving a risk of a tit-for-tat response were they to drop one of the candidates from their ballot, also voted for both. Ultimately all 73 Republicans ended up supporting both Jefferson and Burr. The resulting tie nearly caused a constitutional crisis when the tiebreaking mechanism deadlocked as well.

Applied to Approval voting, a Burr dilemma at the same time incentivizes the voters who prefer multiple candidates to vote for all of them as a group, and individual voters to vote for only some of them to break the tie. Like the game of Chicken, each voter would like the other voters to vote for every faction candidate while they vote for a subset.

=== Solutions ===
Nagel argues that instant-runoff voting has a much lower chance of a Burr dilemma, as the only way to exploit the situation is by the use of monotonicity failures; and that, in contrast, voters can use risky strategy ("driving straight" in the game of Chicken) by truncating in Approval voting and by ranking strong opposition candidates last in Coombs' method.
