= Graduated majority judgment =

Single-winner electoral system

Graduated majority judgment (GMJ), sometimes called the usual judgment or continuous Bucklin voting, is a single-winner rated voting rule that selects the candidate with the highest median score. It was first suggested as an improvement on majority judgment by Andrew Jennings in 2010.

GMJ begins by counting all ballots for their first choice. If no candidate has a majority then later (second, third, etc.) preferences are gradually added in, continuing until one candidate reaches 50% approval. The first candidate to reach a majority of the vote is the winner.

== Highest medians ==
Votes should be cast using a cardinal (rated) ballot, which ask voters to give each candidate a separate grade, such as :

	Awful	Bad	Tolerable	Neutral	Acceptable	Good	Excellent
Candidate A							X
Candidate B	X						
Candidate C						X	
Candidate D				X			

When counting the votes, we calculate the share of each grade for each of the votes cast. This is the candidate's "merit profile":

Candidate	Awful	Bad	Tolerable	Neutral	Acceptable	Good	Excellent
A	2%	15%	21%	20%	9%	18%	15%
B	2%	17%	19%	13%	13%	12%	24%
C	1%	9%	10%	15%	15%	25%	25%

For each candidate, we determine the median or majority grade as the grade where a majority of voters would oppose giving the candidate a higher grade, but a majority would also oppose giving a lower grade. This rule means that the absolute majority of the electors judge that a candidates merits at least its median grade, while half the electors judge that he deserves at most its median grade.

If only one candidate has the highest median grade, they are elected (as in all highest median voting rules). Otherwise, the election uses a tie-breaking procedure.

== Tie-breaking ==
Graduated majority judgment uses a simple line-drawing method to break ties. This rule is easier to explain than others such as majority judgment, and also guarantees continuity.

Graphically, we can represent this by drawing a plot showing the share of voters who assign an approval less than the given score, then draw lines connecting the points on this graph. The place where this plot intersects 50% is each candidate's final score.

=== Mathematical formula ===
Say the median grade of a candidate $c$ is $\alpha _c$ (when there is a tie, we define the median as halfway between the neighboring grades). Let $p_c$ (the share of proponents) refer to the share of electors giving $c$ a score strictly better than the median grade. The share of opponents of $c$, written $q_c$, is the share of grades falling below the median. Then the complete score for GMJ is given by the following formula:
$$n_c = \alpha_c + \frac{1}{2} \frac{p_c-q_c}{1-p_c-q_c}$$

=== Example ===
Consider the same election as before, but relabeling the verbal grades as numbers on a scale from 0 to 6:

Grade Candidate	0	1	2	3	4	5	6
A (Running total)	2%	15%	21%	20%	9%	18%	15%
A (Running total)	100%	98%	83%	62%	43%	33%	15%
B (Running total)	2%	17%	19%	13%	13%	12%	24%
B (Running total)	100%	98%	81%	62%	49%	36%	24%
C (Running total)	1%	9%	10%	15%	15%	25%	25%
C (Running total)	100%	99%	90%	80%	65%	50%	25%

Candidates A and B both cross the 50% threshold at 3, so we must invoke the tiebreaking procedure for them (C is the winner with a median of 4). When we do, we find that the GMJ for candidates A, B, and C are 3.10, 3.42, and 4.50 respectively. Thus, Candidate C is declared the winner.

=== Race analogy ===
The tiebreaking rule can be explained using an analogy where every candidate is in a race. Each candidate takes 1 minute to run from one grade to the next, and they run at a constant speed when moving from one grade to the next. The winner is the first candidate to cross the finish line at 50% of the vote. You can see it if you graph the running total of the candidates with the X axis going from 6 to 0.

=== Additional tie-breaking ===
In the unusual case of a tie where the formula above does not determine a single winner (if several candidates have exactly the same score), ties can be broken by binning together the 3 grades closest to the median, then repeating the tie-breaking procedure. In the example above, we would combine all "Good," "Fair," and "Passable" grades into a new "Passable to Good" grade, then apply the same tie-breaking formula as before. This process can be repeated multiple times (binning more and more grades) until a winner is found.

== Properties and advantages ==
=== Advantages and disadvantages common to highest-median rules ===
As an electoral system, the graduated majority judgment shares most of its advantages with other highest-median voting rules such as majority judgment, including its resistance to tactical voting. It also shares most of its disadvantages (for example, it fails the participation criterion, and can fail the majority criterion arbitrarily badly).

=== Specific advantages of graduated majority judgment ===
The tie-breaking formula of the graduated majority judgment presents specific advantages over the other highest-median voting rules.

==== Continuity ====
The function defined by the graduated majority judgment tie-breaking formula is a continuous function (as well as being almost-everywhere differentiable), whereas the functions of majority judgment and typical judgment are discontinuous. In other words, a small change in the number of votes for each candidate is unlikely to change the winner of the election, because small changes in vote shares result in only small changes in the overall rating.

This property makes the graduated majority judgment a more robust voting method in the face of accusations of fraud or demands of a recount of all votes. As small differences of votes are less likely to change the outcome of the election, candidates are less likely to contest results.

== See also ==
- Bucklin voting, a similar voting rule
- Majority judgment
- Highest median voting rules
- Range voting
