= Spoiler effect =

Election result affecting losing candidate

In social choice theory and politics, a spoiler effect happens when a losing candidate affects the results of an election simply by participating. Voting rules that are not affected by spoilers are said to be spoilerproof, and satisfy independence of irrelevant alternatives.

The frequency and severity of spoiler effects depends substantially on the voting method. First-past-the-post voting, especially if without winnowing or primary elections, is sensitive to spoilers. And so, to a degree, are instant-runoff voting (often called ranked-choice voting (RCV) in the US) and the two-round system (TRS). Majority-rule (or Condorcet) methods are only rarely affected by spoilers, which are limited to rare situations, called cyclic ties. Rated voting systems are not subject to Arrow's theorem, allowing them to be spoilerproof so long as voters' ratings are consistent across elections.

Spoiler effects can also occur in some methods of proportional representation, such as the single transferable vote (STV or RCV-PR) and the largest remainders method of party-list representation, where it is called the new states paradox. A new party entering an election causes some seats to shift from one unrelated party to another, even if the new party wins no seats. This kind of spoiler effect is avoided by divisor methods and proportional approval.

== Motivation ==
In decision theory, independence of irrelevant alternatives is a fundamental principle of rational choice which says that a decision between two outcomes, A or B, should not depend on the quality of a third, unrelated outcome C. A famous joke by Sidney Morgenbesser illustrates this principle:

A man is deciding whether to order apple, blueberry, or cherry pie before settling on apple. The waitress informs him that the cherry pie is very good and a favorite of most customers. The man replies "in that case, I'll have the blueberry."

Politicians and social choice theorists have long argued for the unfairness of spoiler effects. The mathematician and political economist Nicolas de Condorcet was the first to study the spoiler effect, in the 1780s.

=== Manipulation by politicians ===
Voting systems that violate independence of irrelevant alternatives are susceptible to being manipulated by strategic nomination. Such systems may produce an incentive to entry, increasing a candidate's chances of winning if similar candidates join the race, or an incentive to exit, reducing the candidate's chances of winning. Some systems are particularly infamous for their ease of manipulation, such as the Borda count, which exhibits a particularly severe entry incentive, letting any party "clone their way to victory" by running a large number of candidates. This famously forced de Borda to concede that "my system is meant only for honest men", and eventually led to its abandonment by the French Academy of Sciences.

Other systems exhibit an exit incentive. The vote splitting effect in plurality voting demonstrates this method's strong exit incentive: if multiple candidates with similar views run in an election, their supporters' votes will be diluted, which may cause a unified opposition candidate to win despite having less support. This effect encourages groups of similar candidates to form an organization to make sure they do not step on each other's toes.

== By electoral system ==
Susceptibility to spoilers
Electoral system	Spoiler effect
Plurality voting	High
Runoffs or RCV	Medium
Condorcet methods	Low
Score or medians	None

Different electoral systems have different levels of vulnerability to spoilers. In general, spoilers are common with plurality voting, somewhat common in plurality-runoff methods, rare with majoritarian methods, and impossible for most rated voting methods. (Note: Strategic voting can sometimes create additional spoiler-like behavior. However, this does not substantially affect the general order described here.)

=== First-preference plurality ===
In cases where there are many similar candidates, spoiler effects occur most often in first-preference plurality (FPP). For example, in the United States, vote splitting is common in primaries, where many similar candidates run against each other. The purpose of a primary election is to eliminate vote splitting among candidates from the same party in the general election by running only one candidate. In a two-party system, party primaries effectively turn FPP into a two-round system.

Vote splitting is the most common cause of spoiler effects in FPP. In these systems, the presence of many ideologically-similar candidates causes their vote total to be split between them, placing these candidates at a disadvantage. This is most visible in elections where a minor candidate draws votes away from a major candidate with similar politics, thereby causing a strong opponent of both to win.

=== Runoff systems ===
Plurality-runoff methods like the two-round system and RCV still experience vote-splitting in each round. This produces a kind of spoiler effect called a center squeeze. Compared to plurality without primaries, the elimination of weak candidates in earlier rounds reduces their effect on the final results; however, spoiled elections remain common compared to other systems. As a result, instant-runoff voting still tends towards two-party rule through the process known as Duverger's law. A notable example of this can be seen in Alaska's 2024 race, where party elites pressured candidate Nancy Dahlstrom into dropping out to avoid a repeat of the spoiled 2022 election.

=== Tournament (Condorcet) voting ===
Spoiler effects rarely occur when using tournament solutions, where candidates are compared in one-on-one matchups to determine relative preference. For each pair of candidates, there is a count for how many voters prefer the first candidate in the pair to the second candidate. The resulting table of pairwise counts eliminates the step-by-step redistribution of votes, which is usually the cause for spoilers in other methods. This pairwise comparison means that spoilers can only occur when there is a Condorcet cycle, where there is no single candidate preferred to all others.

Theoretical models suggest that somewhere between 90% and 99% of real-world elections have a Condorcet winner, and the first Condorcet cycle in a ranked American election was found in 2021. Some systems like the Schulze method and ranked pairs have stronger spoiler resistance guarantees that limit which candidates can spoil an election without a Condorcet winner.

=== Rated voting ===
Rated voting methods ask voters to assign each candidate a score on a scale (e.g. rating them from 0 to 10), instead of listing them from first to last. Highest median and score (highest mean) voting are the two most prominent examples of rated voting rules. Whenever voters rate candidates independently, the rating given to one candidate does not affect the ratings given to the other candidates. Any new candidate cannot change the winner of the race without becoming the winner themselves, which would disqualify them from the definition of a spoiler. For this to hold, in some elections, some voters must use less than their full voting power despite having meaningful preferences among viable candidates.

The outcome of rated voting depends on the scale used by the voter or assumed by the mechanism. If the voters use relative scales, i.e. scales that depend on what candidates are running, then the outcome can change if candidates who don't win drop out. Empirical results from panel data suggest that judgments are at least in part relative. Thus, rated methods, as used in practice, may exhibit a spoiler effect caused by the interaction between the voters and the system, even if the system itself passes IIA given an absolute scale.

=== Proportional representation ===
Spoiler effects can also occur in some methods of proportional representation, such as the single transferable vote (STV or RCV-PR) and the largest remainders method of party-list representation, where it is called a new party paradox. A new party entering an election causes some seats to shift from one unrelated party to another, even if the new party wins no seats. This kind of spoiler effect is avoided by divisor methods and proportional approval.

== Spoiler campaign ==
=== United States ===
A spoiler campaign in the United States is often one that cannot realistically win but can still determine the outcome by pulling support from a more competitive candidate. The two major parties in the United States, the Republican Party and Democratic Party, have regularly won 98% of all state and federal seats. The US presidential elections most consistently cited as having been spoiled by third-party candidates are 1844, 1912, and 2000. The 2016 election is more disputed as to whether it contained spoiler candidates or not. For the 2024 presidential election, Republican lawyers and operatives have fought to keep right-leaning third-parties like the Constitution Party off swing state ballots while working to get leftists like Cornel West on battleground ballots. Democrats have helped some right-leaning third-parties gain ballot access while challenging ballot access of left-leaning third-parties like the Green Party. According to the Associated Press, the GOP effort to prop up possible spoiler candidates in 2024 appears more far-reaching than the Democratic effort. Barry Burden argues that they have almost no chance of winning the 2024 election but are often motivated by particular issues.

Third party candidates are always controversial because almost anyone could play spoiler. This is especially true in close elections where the chances of a spoiler effect increase. Strategic voting, especially prevalent during high stakes elections with high political polarization, often leads to a third-party that underperforms its poll numbers with voters wanting to make sure their least favorite candidate is not in power. Third-party campaigns are more likely to result in the candidate a third party voter least wants in the White House. Third-party candidates prefer to focus on their platform than on their impact on the frontrunners.

=== Notable unintentional spoilers ===
An unintentional spoiler is one that has a realistic chance of winning but falls short and affects the outcome of the election. Some third-party candidates express ambivalence about which major party they prefer and their possible role as spoiler or deny the possibility.

==== 2009 Burlington mayoral election ====
In Burlington, Vermont's second IRV election, spoiler Kurt Wright knocked out Democrat Andy Montroll in the second round, leading to the election of Bob Kiss, despite the election results showing most voters preferred Montroll to Kiss. The results of every possible one-on-one election can be completed as follows:

Andy Montroll (D)	6262 (Montroll) – 591 (Simpson)	4570 (Montroll) – 2997 (Smith)	4597 (Montroll) – 3664 (Wright)	4064 (Montroll) – 3476 (Kiss)	4/4 Wins
Bob Kiss (P)	5514 (Kiss) – 844 (Simpson)	3944 (Kiss) – 3576 (Smith)	4313 (Kiss) – 4061 (Wright)	3/4 Wins	RCV winner
Kurt Wright (R)	5270 (Wright) – 1310 (Simpson)	3971 (Wright) – 3793 (Smith)	2/4 Wins	Spoiler for Montroll	
Dan Smith (I)	5570 (Smith) – 721 (Simpson)	1/4 Wins			
James Simpson (G)	0/4 Wins				

This leads to an overall preference ranking of:

1. Montroll – defeats all candidates below, including Kiss (4,064 to 3,476)
2. Kiss – defeats all candidates below, including Wright (4,313 to 4,061)
3. Wright – defeats all candidates below, including Smith (3,971 to 3,793)
4. Smith – defeats Simpson (5,570 to 721) and the write-in candidates

Montroll was therefore preferred over Kiss by 54% of voters, over Wright by 56%, and over Smith by 60%. Had Wright not run, Montroll would have won instead of Kiss. Because all ballots were fully released, it is possible to reconstruct the winners under other voting methods. While Wright would have won under plurality, Kiss won under IRV, and would have won under a two-round vote or a traditional nonpartisan blanket primary. Montroll, being the majority-preferred candidate, would have won if the ballots were counted using ranked pairs (or any other Condorcet method).

==== 2022 Alaska's at-large congressional district special election ====
In Alaska's first-ever IRV election, Nick Begich was eliminated in the first round to advance Mary Peltola and Sarah Palin; however, the pairwise comparison shows that Begich was the Condorcet winner while Palin was both the Condorcet loser and a spoiler:

Pairwise comparison matrix by vote totals
	Begich	Peltola	Palin
Begich	-	88,126	101,438
Peltola	79,486	-	91,375
Palin	63,666	86,197	-

Pairwise as a percentage
Winner		Loser	Winner	Loser
Begich	vs.	Peltola	52.6%	vs. 47.4%
Begich	vs.	Palin	61.4%	vs. 38.6%
Peltola	vs.	Palin	51.5%	vs. 48.5%

In the wake of the election, a poll found 54% of Alaskans, including a third of Peltola voters, supported a repeal of RCV. Observers noted such pathologies would have occurred under Alaska's previous primary system as well, leading several to suggest Alaska adopt any one of several alternatives without this behavior. In 2024 Alaska Ballot Measure 2 which would have repealed ranked-choice voting in the state failed by 700 votes. A ballot measure that would repeal ranked-choice voting as well and would eliminating campaign finance provisions that is intended to reduce the influence of dark money will appear in the 2026 United States elections.

== Rhetoric ==
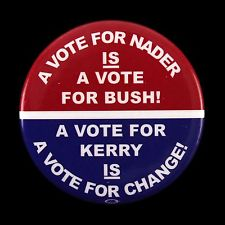
2004 Anti-Nader Kerry campaign button.

Spoiler effect rhetoric refers to common phrases and rhetorical techniques used to advance the spoiler effect argument encourage people not to "split the vote."

=== "A vote for X is a vote for Y" ===
A vote for X is a vote for Y is a common argument that has found widespread usage in the United States, where it was especially used in the 2016 and 2024 United States presidential elections in regard to the Green Party of the United States. It implies that if you vote for a third-party candidate, you are not voting for one of the two candidates most likely to win; and by not voting for your preferred candidate among these two you are effectively voting for the other of the two.

=== United Kingdom ===
Prime Minister Rishi Sunak discouraged voters of choosing Reform UK following conservative losses in Wellingborough and Kingswood to the Labour Party. Sunak stated, “That's the actual choice at the general election, between me and him (Keir Starmer), between the Conservatives and Labour."

In June while campaigning during the 2024 general election, health secretary Victoria Atkins stated in an interview with Channel 4 News that a vote for Reform UK is the same as voting for the Labour Party. When asked by Matt Frei if Nigel Farage (the leader of Reform UK) was dividing the right and splitting the vote, she stated, "The vote for Reform is a vote for the Labour Party. So if you want to see higher taxes, higher immigration, if you want to see all of the things that we have gathered together and benefited from as we’ve left the European Union... that will be a Labour government courtesy of a vote for Reform."

On December 27, the socialist party Your Party tweeted "Vote Labour, get Reform" in response to the Labour government's attempt to end trial by jury.

Ahead of the 2026 Gorton and Denton by-election, the Labour and Green parties both made themselves out to be the sole competitor against Reform UK. The Muslim Vote endorsed the Green Party on January 27, and in February, they tweeted a poll showing the Greens ahead titled "A vote for Labour is a vote for Reform in Gorton and Denton." On February 24, the Green Party's Facebook page posted a campaign video with the caption, "Vote Labour, get Reform."

=== United States ===
==== Republican Party ====
In 1992, Representative Alex McMillan disapproved of independent candidate Ross Perot's campaign, stating in the Los Angeles Times "a vote for Perot is a vote for Clinton."

During the 2016 Republican Party presidential primaries, John Kasich's campaign stated that "a vote for Cruz is a vote for Trump" when competing against Ted Cruz and Donald Trump for the nomination. In March, Mike Leavitt wrote in a New York Times op-ed that Republicans should vote for Kasich over Cruz to block Trump from receiving the nomination. After Donald Trump won the 2016 Republican Party presidential primaries, conservative commentator and comedian Dennis Miller stated, "Don't kid yourself. At this point, any vote for anyone that is not Donald Trump is a vote for Hillary Clinton. Also, both Presidential boxes left blank is a vote for Hillary Clinton because, as mindless as Liberals can be, even they don't enter into suicide pacts with that petulant, whiny part of themselves."

==== Democratic Party ====
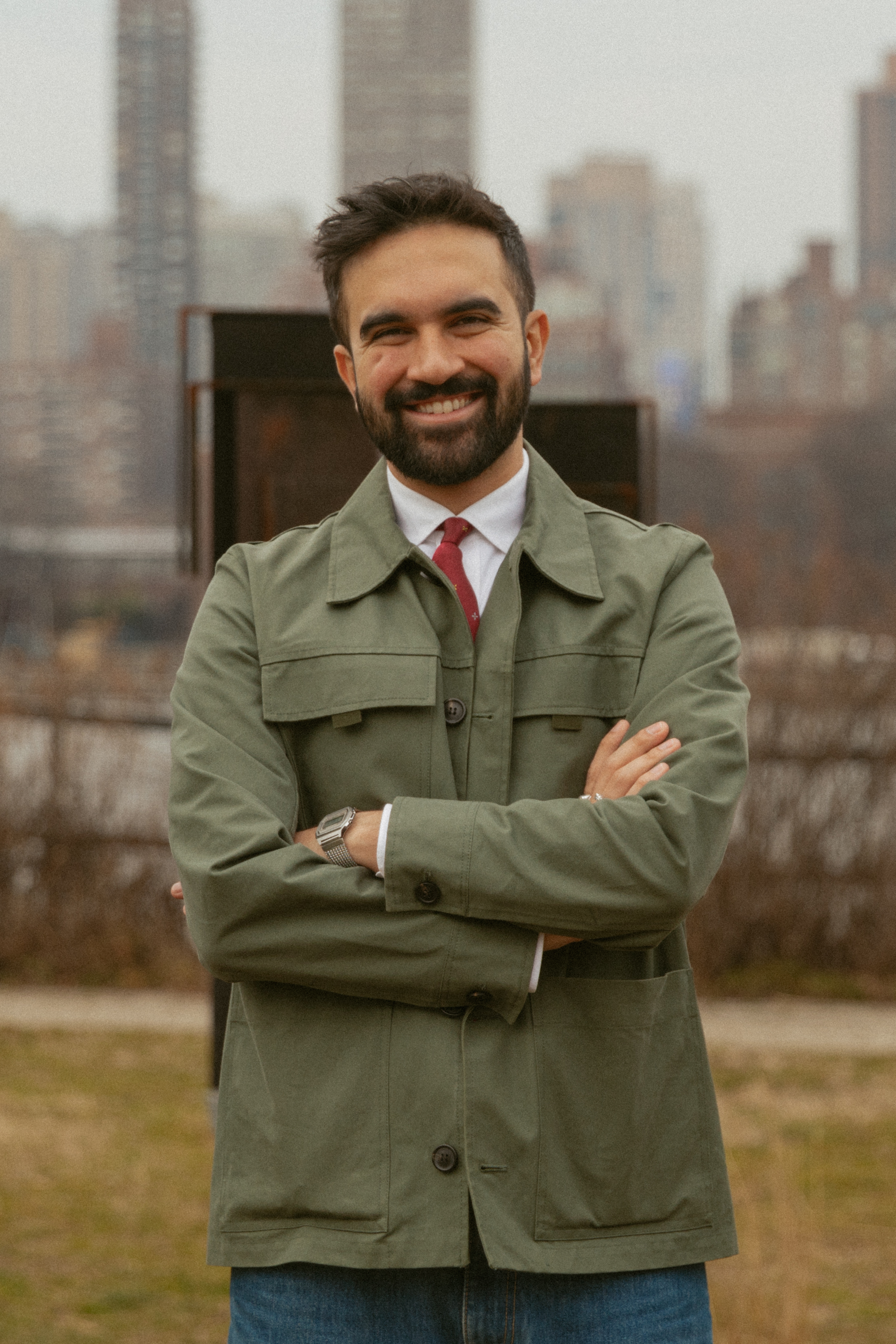
Zohran Mamdani is only the second-ever member of the Democratic Socialists of America to serve as Mayor of New York City.

During the Democratic primary for New York City Mayor in 2025, democratic socialist Zohran Mamdani defeated former New York governor Andrew Cuomo. Following his loss, Cuomo congratulated Mamdani, and then launched an independent campaign. During the campaign, Mamdani stated that a vote for Cuomo would be akin to a vote for Trump, due to both of them sharing similar donors. Trump himself stated that a vote for the Republican candidate, Curtis Sliwa, would be like a vote for Mamdani, saying New Yorkers should vote for Cuomo "whether you personally like [him] or not.” In an October 2025 interview on WABC 770, Cuomo told John Catsimatidis “I want to say to your Republican listeners: Vote like a New Yorker. Don't vote like a Republican. A vote for Curtis is a vote for Zohran. Vote like a New Yorker and stop Zohran." Supporters of Cuomo attempted to convince Sliwa voters to abandon his campaign. In an op-ed in AmNewYork, writers Samantha Ettus and Aliza Licht wrote, "In this election, a vote for Sliwa equates to a vote for Mamdani — a man whose rhetoric and policies defy the American dream..." Sliwa rejected the comparison.

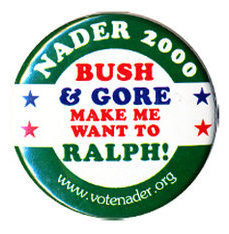
Ralph Nader 2000 campaign button.

==== Green Party ====
The Green Party of the United States has been blamed for splitting the vote in multiple elections, starting in 2000, when Vice President Al Gore lost to Republican George W. Bush in a close election. In a speech to 30,000 in Madison, Wisconsin during the campaign trail, Gore stated “If the big oil companies and the chemical manufacturers and the big polluters were able to communicate a message to this state, they would say, ‘Vote for George Bush, or in any case, vote for Ralph Nader.’”

In 2004, Ralph Nader would again run, this time as an independent. Following his unsuccessful campaign for the nomination, Howard Dean would campaign for the victor of the Democratic primary, John Kerry. While campaigning, Dean would state, "I think Ralph Nader's candidacy is the single biggest danger to the Kerry candidacy." The American Enterprise Institute described the campaign's mission was to "drive home a point that should be obvious after 2000: A vote for Nader is a vote for Bush."

In the lead up to the 2024 election, President of the Human Rights Campaign, Kelley Robinson, stated that "Any vote that is not for Joe Biden is a vote for Donald Trump. Full stop and period"

After Biden exited the race, Kamala Harris was chosen as the party's nominee. Opposition to her candidacy led to the Abandon Harris protest movement emerging. In September 2024, ahead of the election, The Cap Times attributed Hillary Clinton's 2016 loss to the Green Party's Jill Stein and stated, "We should not trick ourselves into believing we have fulfilled our voting obligations by voting for a third party or write-in and being "pure" because we did not compromise. That protest is a vote for Trump." The Democratic Party released its first ad against a third party on October 11 in swing states with a narrow margin between Trump and Harris. The ad, called "Crucial," stated that a vote for Stein was a vote for Trump. The ad used a clip of Trump from a campaign rally where he said “I like her very much. You know why? She takes 100 percent from them,” referring to the Democrats.

== See also ==
- Comparison of electoral systems
- Independence of clones
- Independence of Smith-dominated alternatives
- Sortition
- Spoiler effect rhetoric
