= Bucklin voting =

Class of electoral systems

Bucklin voting is an election system that uses ranked (but nontransferable) votes and can be used for single-member and multi-member districts. As in a highest median election system, such as the majority judgment, the Bucklin winner will be one or more candidates with high median ranking or rating. The system is named after its original promoter, Georgist politician James W. Bucklin of Grand Junction, Colorado. The system is also known as the Grand Junction system. The election system is described in Bucklin's 1911 book The Grand Junction Plan of City Government and Its Results.

It is not used today. It was never widely used but was used in city elections in Cleveland from 1915 to 1921.

It has the weakness that a voter's secondary preference may be used against the voter's first preference. Voters learn not to make secondary preferences. In the 1921 election in Cleveland, 72 percent of the voters marked only their first preference for mayor.

== Voting process ==
Bucklin rules varied, but here is a typical single-winner example:

Voters mark ranked votes where candidates are ranked (first, second, third, etc.).

First, the first choice votes on all the ballots are counted. If one candidate has a majority (more than half the valid votes), that candidate wins.

Otherwise the second choices on all the ballots are added to the first choices. Again, if a candidate is found to have a number of votes that exceed half of ballots cast, that person is the winner. If no one has majority, lower rankings are added as needed.

After the first round, there may be more votes counted than voters, so it is possible for more than one candidate to have support that exceeds a majority of ballots cast. If that happens, the most-popular candidate is the winner.

== Variants and relationships to other methods ==
The term Bucklin voting refers to the process of counting all votes on all ballots to aid candidates in achieving some threshold, and then adjusting that threshold down until a majority is reached. In some variants which have been used, equal ranking was allowed at some or all ranks. Some variants had a predetermined number of ranks available (usually 2 or 3), while others had unlimited ranks. There were also variants akin to Borda voting in that lower-ranked votes counted for less.

The Bucklin procedure is one way to ensure that the winning candidate will be among those with the highest median vote. When used with a cardinal voting scale instead of ordinal ranking, Bucklin's balloting method is the same as that of highest median rules such as the Majority Judgment. However, Bucklin's selection algorithm starts with the highest rated preferences and adds lower ones until a median winner is reached, whereas Majority Judgment starts with the median votes and removes them until all but one candidate is eliminated. Due to this difference, Bucklin passes some voting criteria that Majority Judgment fails, and vice versa.

== Bucklin applied to multiwinner elections ==
Bucklin was used for multiwinner elections. For multi-member districts, voters marked as many first choices as there were seats to be filled. Voters then had to mark the same number of second and further choices.

In some localities, the voter was required to mark a full set of first choices, as many first preferences as the number of seats, for his or her ballot to be valid. However, allowing voters to cast three simultaneous votes for three seats (block voting) could allow an organized 51%, or the largest minority in a contest with three or more slates, to win all three seats in the first round, so this method does not give proportional representation.

== History and usage ==
The method was proposed by Condorcet in 1793, and was reported as having seen use by the Republic of Geneva later that year. It was re-invented under its current name and used in many political elections in the United States in the early 20th century, as were other experimental election methods during the Progressive Era. Bucklin voting was first used in 1909 in Grand Junction, Colorado, and then used in more than sixty other cities including Denver and San Francisco. Because the Bucklin method allows a voter's secondary preference to be used against a voter's first choice, some voters refused to mark secondary preferences so as to aid their first preference as much as possible, and the system sometimes came to operate like plurality block voting or single non-transferable voting.

In two states, it was found to violate the state constitution and overturned; in the remainder of states using it, it was repealed. In Minnesota, it was ruled unconstitutional, in a decision that disallowed votes for multiple candidates, in opposition to some voters' single expressed preference, and in a variant used in Oklahoma, the particular application required voters in multi-candidate elections to rank more than one candidate, or the vote would not be counted; and the preferential primary was therefore found unconstitutional. The canvassing method itself was not rejected in Oklahoma.

Adoption by Location (Note: All instances of this system were later abolished, but the dates are unknown.)
State	Election	Year Adopted	Notes
Washington	State Primaries	1907	Predates traditional Bucklin voting and is slightly modified: candidates could win with 40% of the vote. The idea may have been based on a proposed primary law for Wisconsin suggested by Governor La Follete a year earlier.
Colorado	Grand Junction	1909	
Washington	Spokane	1910	
Colorado	Pueblo	1911	
Louisiana	New Iberia	1912	
Minnesota	Duluth	1913	
Colorado	Denver	1913	
Colorado	Colorado Springs	1913	
Oregon	Portland	1913	
New Hampshire	Nashua	1913	
Ohio	Cleveland	1913	
Colorado	Fort Collins	1913	
Oregon	La Grande	1913	
California	San Francisco	1917	Replaced by STV in 5-7 seat districts

== Satisfied and failed criteria ==
Bucklin voting satisfies the majority criterion, the mutual majority criterion and the monotonicity criterion.

Bucklin voting without equal rankings allowed fails the Condorcet criterion, independence of clones criterion, later-no-harm, participation, consistency, reversal symmetry, the Condorcet loser criterion and the independence of irrelevant alternatives criterion.

If equal and skipped rankings are allowed, Bucklin passes or fails the same criteria as highest median rules like the Majority Judgment.

== Example application ==
Tennessee voting pattern

42% of voters	26% of voters	15% of voters	17% of voters
1. Memphis; 2. Nashville; 3. Chattanooga; 4. Knoxville	1. Nashville; 2. Chattanooga; 3. Knoxville; 4. Memphis	1. Chattanooga; 2. Knoxville; 3. Nashville; 4. Memphis	1. Knoxville; 2. Chattanooga; 3. Nashville; 4. Memphis

Suppose Tennessee is holding an election on the location of its capital. The population is split between four cities, and all the voters want the capital to be as close to them as possible. The options are:

- Memphis, large but far to the west
- Nashville, medium, near the center
- Chattanooga, small and in the east
- Knoxville, small and isolated

City	Round 1	Round 2
Memphis	42	42
Nashville	26	68
Chattanooga	15	58
Knoxville	17	32

The first round has no majority winner. Therefore, the second rank votes are added. This moves Nashville and Chattanooga above 50%, so a winner can be determined. Since Nashville is supported by a higher majority (68% versus 58%), Nashville is the winner.

== Voter strategy ==
Voters supporting a strong candidate have an incentive to bullet vote (offer only one first-rank vote), in hopes that other voters will add enough votes to help their candidate win. This strategy is most secure if the supported candidate appears likely to gain many second-rank votes.

In the above example, Memphis voters have the most first-place votes and might not offer a second preference in hopes of winning, but the strategy fails, unless other voters also bullet vote, because they are not a second-place choice of competitors.

If all Memphis voters bullet vote, Chattanooga voters could cause their city to win by all bullet voting. However, if all Nashville voters also do the same, Memphis would win on the fourth and final round. In that case, Knoxville voters could do nothing to change the outcome.

In this particular example (but not always), bullet voting benefits one group of voters only if another group or groups do it as well. The example shows that, depending upon who does it, bullet voting may distort the outcome and could be counterproductive for some voters who do it (here, those from Chattanooga and Nashville).

To prevent bullet voting, voters could be required to rank all candidates on the ballot. This would provide the voter with a disincentive to bullet vote, as the vote would not be counted unless all candidates are ranked.

== See also ==
- List of democracy and elections-related topics
- Voting system
  - Plurality voting system
  - Instant-runoff voting
  - Approval voting
  - Score voting
  - Borda count
  - Expanding Approvals Rule
