= Implicit utilitarian voting =

Use of approximation algorithms in voting

Implicit utilitarian voting is a voting system in which agents are assumed to have utilities for each alternative, but they express their preferences only by ranking the alternatives (like in ranked voting). The system tries to select an alternative which maximizes the sum of utilities, as in the utilitarian social choice rule, based only on the ranking information provided. Implicit utilitarian voting attempts to approximate score voting or the utilitarian rule, even in situations where cardinal utilities are unavailable.

The main challenge of implicit utilitarian voting is that rankings do not contain enough information to calculate exact utilities, meaning that maximizing social welfare in all cases is impossible. Thus, implicit utilitarian voting aims to find an alternative whose social welfare is approximately optimal.

The quality of approximation for a voting rule is measured by its distortion or regret, which measures the worst-case error (utility loss) caused by using the ranked-voting rule to approximate utility.

Some achievements in the theory of IUV are:

- Designing voting rules that minimize the distortion in single-winner elections and in multi-winner elections;
- Analyzing the distortion of various existing voting rules;
- Analyzing the distortion of various input formats for preference elicitation in participatory budgeting.

== See also ==
- Utilitarian rule
- Score voting
