= Highest median voting rules =

Type of voting rules for an election

The highest median voting rules are a class of graded voting rules where the candidate with the highest median rating is elected.

The various highest median rules differ in their treatment of ties, i.e., the method of ranking the candidates with the same median rating.

Proponents of highest median rules argue that they provide the most faithful reflection of the voters' opinion according to the median voter theorem. They note that as with other cardinal voting rules, highest medians are not subject to Arrow's impossibility theorem.

However, critics note that highest median rules violate participation and the Archimedean property; highest median rules can fail to elect a candidate almost-unanimously preferred over all other candidates.

== Example ==
As in score voting or other rules with rated ballots, voters rate candidates along a single scale. Grades can be either verbal (e.g. "good") or numerical (e.g. on a five-star scale). Then, for each candidate, we calculate what percentage of voters assigned them each grade, e.g.:

Candidate	Excellent	Very Good	Good	Fair	Passable	Inadequate	Bad	TOTAL
A	5%	13%	21%	20%	9%	17%	15%	100%
B	5%	14%	19%	13%	13%	12%	24%	100%
C	4%	6%	10%	15%	16%	24%	25%	100%

This is presented graphically in the form of a cumulative histogram whose total corresponds to 100% of the votes cast:

An example of a cumulative histogram for a highest-median voting rule.

For each candidate, we then determine the majority (or median) grade (shown here in bold). This rule means that an absolute majority (more than 50%) of voters judge that a candidate deserves at least its majority grade, and that half or more (50% or more) of the electors judge that same candidate to deserve at the most its majority grade. Thus, the majority grade looks like a median.

If only one candidate has the highest median score, they are elected. Otherwise, highest median rules must invoke a tiebreaking procedure to choose between the candidates with the highest median grade.

== Tiebreaking procedures ==
When different candidates share the same median rating, a tie-breaking rule is required, analogous to interpolation. For discrete grading scales, the median is insensitive to changes in the data and highly sensitive to the choice of scale (as there are large "gaps" between ratings).

Most tie-breaking rules choose between tied candidates by comparing their relative shares of proponents (above-median grades) and opponents (below-median grades). The share of proponents and opponents are represented by $p$ and $q$ respectively, while their share of median grades is written as $m$.

- The typical judgment ranks candidates by the number of proponents minus the number of opponents, i.e. $p-q$.
- The central judgment divides the typical judgment by the total number of proponents and opponents.
- Continuous Bucklin voting or Graduated Majority Judgment (GMJ), also called the usual judgment, ranks candidates by the share of their median grades needed to reach 50% support.
  - This is equivalent to using a linear interpolation between the current score and the next-highest score.
  - Compared to typical judgment, this leads to a more prominent score difference when the median share is low; in other words, candidates who are more "polarizing" receive more extreme evaluations.
- The majority judgment considers the candidate who is closest to having a rating other than its median and breaks the tie based on that rating.
- Bucklin's rule orders candidates by (one minus) the number of opponents. Anti-Bucklin reverses this (choosing the candidate with the highest share of proponents).

=== Example ===
Example of an election where each choice (or candidate) A-F wins according to one of the tie-breaking rules: typical, central, graduated majority, majority, Bucklin, and anti-Bucklin.

The example in the following table shows a six-way tied rating, where each alternative wins under one of the rules mentioned above. (All scores apart from Bucklin/anti-Bucklin are scaled to fall in $\left[-\frac{1}{2}, \frac{1}{2} \right]$to allow for interpreting them as interpolations between the next-highest and next-lowest scores.)

Candidate	Against	For	Diff	Central	Majority	GMJ
A	15%	30%	15%	17%	30%	14%
B	4%	11%	7%	23%	11%	4%
C	27%	40%	13%	10%	40%	20%
D	43%	45%	2%	1%	45%	8%
E	3%	0%	-3%	-50%	-3%	-2%
F	49%	46%	-3%	-2%	-49%	-30%
Formula	$p$	$q$	$p-q$	$\frac{p-q}{2(p+q)}$	$\min(p, -q)$	$\frac{p -q}{2 m}$

== Advantages and Disadvantages ==
=== Advantages ===
==== Common to cardinal voting methods ====
Cardinal voting systems allow voters to provide much more information than ranked-choice ballots (so long as there are enough categories); in addition to allowing voters to specify which of two candidates they prefer, cardinal ballots allow them to express how strongly they prefer such candidates. Voters can choose between a wide variety of options for rating candidates, allowing for nuanced judgments of quality.

Because highest median methods ask voters to evaluate candidates rather than rank them, they escape Arrow's impossibility theorem, and satisfy both unanimity and independence of irrelevant alternatives. However, highest medians fail the slightly stronger near-unanimity criterion (see #Disadvantages).

Several candidates belonging to a similar political faction can participate in the election without helping or hurting each other, as highest median methods satisfy independence from irrelevant alternatives: Adding candidates does not change the ranking of previous candidates. In other words, if a group ranks A higher than B when choosing between A and B, they should not rank that B higher than A when choosing between A, B, and C.

==== Unique to highest medians ====
The most commonly-cited advantage of highest median rules over their mean-based counterparts is they minimize the number of voters who have an incentive to be dishonest. Voters with weak preferences in particular will not have much incentive to give candidates very high or very low scores. On the other hand, all voters in a score voting system have an incentive to exaggerate, which in theory would lead to de facto approval voting for a large share of the electorate most voters will only give the highest or lowest score to every candidate).

=== Disadvantages ===
==== Participation failure ====
Highest median rules violate the participation criterion; in other words, a candidate may lose because they have "too many supporters."

In the example below, notice how adding ballot 5 causes A (the initial winner) to lose to B:

	1	2	3	4	5	6	Old Median (ballot 3)	New Median (mean of ballots 3 & 4)
A	9	8	7	4	4	0	7	5.5
B	8	7	6	6	0	0	6	6
C	5	3	3	2	0	0	3	2.5

==== Archimedean property ====
Highest median rules violate the Archimedean property; informally, the Archimedean property says that if "99.999...%" of voters prefer Alice to Bob, Alice should defeat Bob. As shown below, it is possible for Bob to defeat Alice in an election, even if only one voter thinks Bob is better than Alice, and a very large number of voters (up to 100%) give Alice a higher rating:

	Many ballots	Median ballot	Many ballots
Alice	100/100	50/100	49/100
Bob	52/100	51/100	0/100
Charlie	0/100	1/100	100/100

In this election, Bob has the highest median score (51) and defeats Alice, even though every voter except one thinks Alice is a better candidate. This is true no matter how many voters there are. As a result, even a single voter's weak preferences can override the strong preferences of the rest of the electorate.

The above example restricted to candidates Alice and Bob also serves as an example of highest median rules failing the majority criterion, although highest medians can pass the majority criterion with normalized ballots (i.e. ballots scaled to use the whole 0-100 range). However, normalization cannot recover the Archimedean criterion.

==== Feasibility ====
A poll of French voters found a majority would be opposed to implementing majority judgment, but a majority would support conducting elections by score voting.

== Related rules ==
- Cardinal voting systems are similar to highest median methods, but determine winners using a statistic other than the median; the most common of these is score voting, which uses the mean.
- Approval voting corresponds to the degenerate case where there are only two possible ratings: approval and disapproval. In this case, all tie-breaking rules are equivalent.

== See also ==
- Cardinal voting
- Majority judgment
- Bucklin voting
- Electoral System
- Comparison of electoral systems
