= Rida Laraki =

French researcher and mathematician

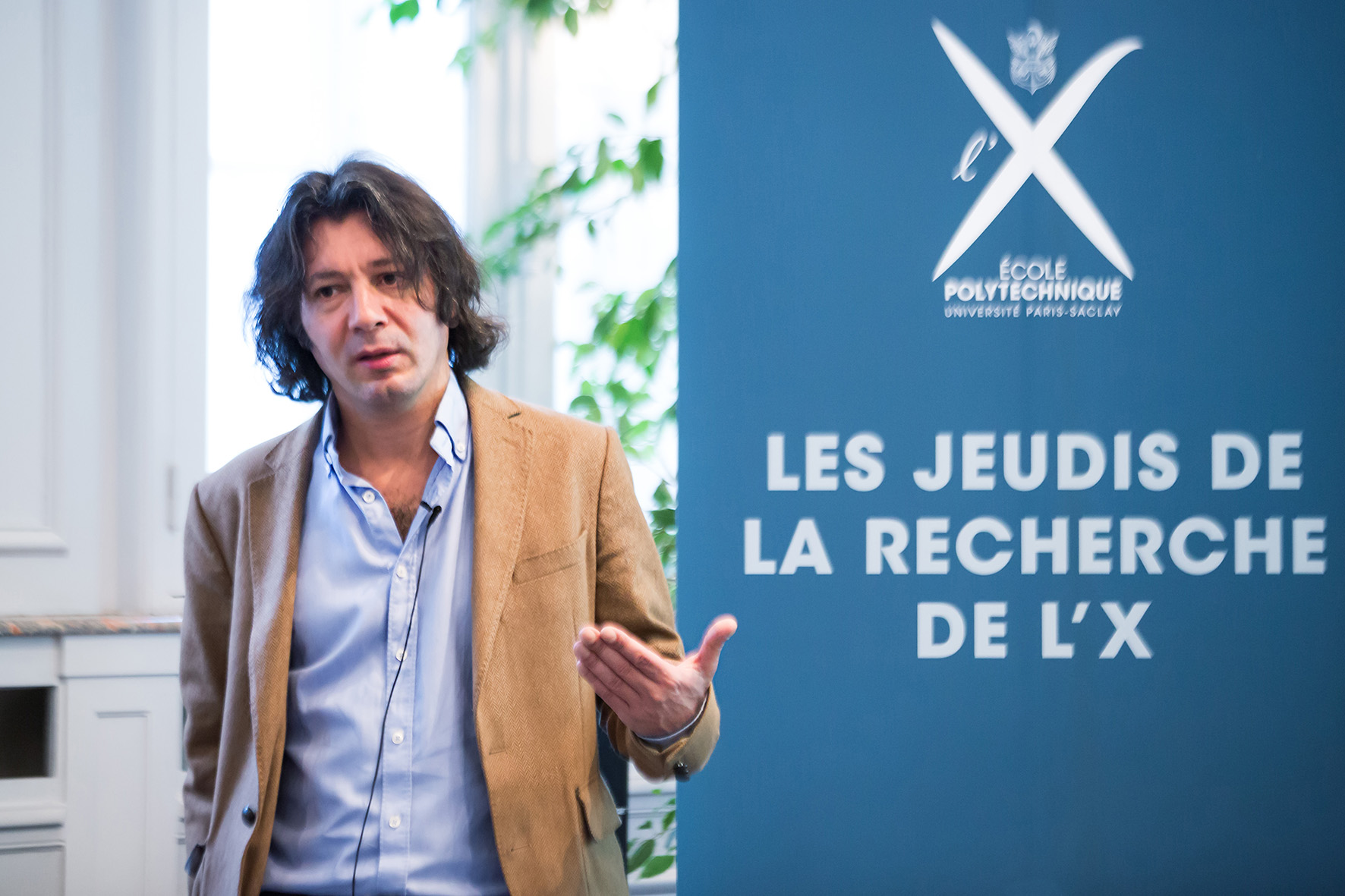
- Born: 1974 (age 51–52); Morocco
- Citizenship: Morocco, France
- Education: École Polytechnique, Pierre and Marie Curie University
- Known for: Majority judgment
- Scientific career
- Fields: Mathematics
- Workplaces: École Polytechnique, French National Centre for Scientific Research
- Doctoral advisor: Sylvain Sorin

Rida Laraki is a Moroccan researcher, professor, and engineer in the fields of game theory, social choice, theoretical economics, optimization, learning, and operations research at the French National Centre for Scientific Research.

== Life ==
Born in 1974, Rida Laraki studied in Morocco and passed his baccalaureate in 1992. After attending preparatory classes at the Mohammed V high school, he joined the École Polytechnique in Paris (X93). He also represented Morocco at the International Mathematics Olympiads in Moscow in 1992 and in Istanbul in 1993. He obtained his engineering degree from Polytechnique in 1996. Four years later, in 2000, he obtained a doctorate in mathematics from the Pierre and Marie Curie University.

He joined the CNRS in 2001 and was a lecturer at Polytechnique for around ten years. He took up the position of lecturer at the École Polytechnique in 2006. Since 2013, he has been director of computer science research at the Laboratory for Analysis and Modeling of Systems for Decision Support (LAMSADE) of the CNRS, and honorary professor at the University of Liverpool in 2017.

He is best known for having designed a collective decision method, called majority judgment, in 2007, with another CNRS researcher, Michel Balinski.

In 2011, he and Balinski published a book with MIT Press presenting this new voting method. He also wrote a book on game theory for Springer Editions in 2019.

== Majority judgment ==
The majority judgment developed by Rida Laraki and Michel Balinski is a voting method based on voting by values, or mention (very good, fair, to be rejected...) ultimately obtaining a "majority grade". It is distinguished by determining the winner by the median rather than the average. It can be applied to political votes but also, for example, to wine rankings. It allows voters to express themselves on all choices.

== Bibliography ==
- Majority Judgment: Measuring, Ranking, and Electing
