= Gibbard's theorem =

Impossibility of straightforward game forms

Gibbard's theorem is a key result in game theory showing that there is no universal non-dictatorial mechanism. It states that for any game form (or mechanism) in which players can hold any set of preferences, at least one of the following must hold:

1. The mechanism is a dictatorship: a single player always dictates the outcome.
2. The mechanism is a duple: there are only two possible outcomes.
3. The mechanism is not straightforward: the optimal action for a voter requires strategic behavior, i.e. it depends on their beliefs about other players.

A corollary of this theorem is the Gibbard–Satterthwaite theorem about voting rules. The key difference between the two theorems is that Gibbard–Satterthwaite applies only to ranked voting. Because of its broader scope, Gibbard's theorem makes no claim about whether voters need to reverse their ranking of candidates, only that their optimal ballots depend on the other voters' ballots. (Note: The terminology for this varies. Gibbard states that 'an individual "manipulates" the voting scheme if, by misrepresenting his preferences, he secures an outcome he prefers to the "honest" outcome', while Brams and Fishburn call every ballot with an honest ordering "sincere.")

Gibbard's theorem is more general, and considers processes of collective decision that may not be ordinal: for example, voting systems where voters assign grades to or otherwise rate candidates (cardinal voting). Gibbard's theorem can be proven using Arrow's impossibility theorem.

Gibbard's theorem is itself generalized by Gibbard's 1978 theorem and Hylland's theorem, which extend these results to non-deterministic processes, i.e. where the outcome may not only depend on the agents' actions but may also involve an element of chance.

== Overview ==
Consider some voters $1$, $2$ and $3$ who wish to select an option among three alternatives: $a$, $b$ and $c$. Assume they use approval voting: each voter assigns to each candidate the grade 1 (approval) or 0 (withhold approval). For example, $(1, 1, 0)$ is an authorized ballot: it means that the voter approves of candidates $a$ and $b$ but does not approve of candidate $c$. Once the ballots are collected, the candidate with highest total grade is declared the winner. Ties between candidates are broken by alphabetical order: for example, if there is a tie between candidates $a$ and $b$, then $a$ wins.

Assume that voter $1$ prefers alternative $a$, then $b$ and then $c$. Which ballot will best defend her opinions? For example, consider the two following situations.

- If the two other voters respectively cast ballots $(0, 1, 1)$ and $(1, 1, 1)$, then voter $1$ has only one ballot that leads to the election of her favorite alternative $a$ : $(1, 0, 0)$.
- However, if we assume instead that the two other voters respectively cast ballots $(0, 0, 1)$ and $(0, 1, 1)$, then voter $1$ should not vote $(1, 0, 0)$ because it makes $c$ win; she should rather vote $(1, 1, 0)$, which makes $b$ win.

To sum up, voter $1$ faces a strategic voting dilemma: depending on the ballots that the other voters will cast, $(1, 0, 0)$ or $(1, 1, 0)$ can be a ballot that best defends her opinions. We then say that approval voting is not strategyproof: once the voter has identified her own preferences, she does not have a ballot at her disposal that best defends her opinions in all situations; she needs to act strategically, possibly by spying over the other voters to determine how they intend to vote.

Gibbard's theorem states that a deterministic process of collective decision cannot be strategyproof, except possibly in two cases: if there is a distinguished agent who has a dictatorial power (unilateral), or if the process limits the outcome to two possible options only (duple).

== Formal statement ==
Let $\mathcal{A}$ be the set of alternatives, which can also be called candidates in a context of voting. Let $\mathcal{N} = \{1, \ldots, n\}$ be the set of agents, which can also be called players or voters, depending on the context of application. For each agent $i$, let $\mathcal{S}_i$ be a set that represents the available strategies for agent $i$; assume that $\mathcal{S}_i$ is finite. Let $g$ be a function that, to each $n$-tuple of strategies $(s_1, \ldots, s_n) \in \mathcal{S}_1 \times \cdots \times \mathcal{S}_n$, maps an alternative. The function $g$ is called a game form. In other words, a game form is essentially defined like an n-player game, but with no utilities associated to the possible outcomes: it describes the procedure only, without specifying a priori the gain that each agent would get from each outcome.

We say that $g$ is strategyproof (originally called: straightforward) if for any agent $i$ and for any strict weak order $P_i$ over the alternatives, there exists a strategy $s_i^*(P_i)$ that is dominant for agent $i$ when she has preferences $P_i$: there is no profile of strategies for the other agents such that another strategy $s_i$, different from $s_i^*(P_i)$, would lead to a strictly better outcome (in the sense of $P_i$). This property is desirable for a democratic decision process: it means that once the agent $i$ has identified her own preferences $P_i$, she can choose a strategy $s_i^*(P_i)$ that best defends her preferences, with no need to know or guess the strategies chosen by the other agents.

We let $\mathcal{S} = \mathcal{S}_1 \times \cdots \times \mathcal{S}_n$ and denote by $g(\mathcal{S})$ the range of $g$, i.e. the set of the possible outcomes of the game form. For example, we say that $g$ has at least 3 possible outcomes if and only if the cardinality of $g(\mathcal{S})$ is 3 or more. Since the strategy sets are finite, $g(\mathcal{S})$ is finite also; thus, even if the set of alternatives $\mathcal{A}$ is not assumed to be finite, the subset of possible outcomes $g(\mathcal{S})$ is necessarily so.

We say that $g$ is dictatorial if there exists an agent $i$ who is a dictator, in the sense that for any possible outcome $a \in g(\mathcal{S})$, agent $i$ has a strategy at her disposal that ensures that the result is $a$, whatever the strategies chosen by the other agents.

Gibbard's theorem—If a game form is not dictatorial and has at least 3 possible outcomes, then it is not strategyproof.

== Examples ==
=== Serial dictatorship ===
We assume that each voter communicates a strict weak order over the candidates. The serial dictatorship is defined as follows. If voter 1 has a unique most-liked candidate, then this candidate is elected. Otherwise, possible outcomes are restricted to his equally most-liked candidates and the other candidates are eliminated. Then voter 2's ballot is examined: if he has a unique best-liked candidate among the non-eliminated ones, then this candidate is elected. Otherwise, the list of possible outcomes is reduced again, etc. If there is still several non-eliminated candidates after all ballots have been examined, then an arbitrary tie-breaking rule is used.

This game form is strategyproof: whatever the preferences of a voter, he has a dominant strategy that consists in declaring his sincere preference order. It is also dictatorial, and its dictator is voter 1: if he wishes to see candidate $a$ elected, then he just has to communicate a preference order where $a$ is the unique most-liked candidate.

=== Simple majority vote ===
If there are only 2 possible outcomes, a game form may be strategyproof and not dictatorial. For example, it is the case of the simple majority vote: each voter casts a ballot for her most-liked alternative (among the two possible outcomes), and the alternative with most votes is declared the winner. This game form is strategyproof because it is always optimal to vote for one's most-liked alternative (unless one is indifferent between them). However, it is clearly not dictatorial. Many other game forms are strategyproof and not dictatorial: for example, assume that the alternative $a$ wins if it gets two thirds of the votes, and $b$ wins otherwise.

=== A game form showing that the converse does not hold ===
Consider the following game form. Voter 1 can vote for a candidate of her choice, or she can abstain. In the first case, the specified candidate is automatically elected. Otherwise, the other voters use a classic voting rule, for example the Borda count. This game form is clearly dictatorial, because voter 1 can impose the result. However, it is not strategyproof: the other voters face the same issue of strategic voting as in the usual Borda count. Thus, Gibbard's theorem is an implication and not an equivalence.

== Extensions ==
Gibbard's 1978 theorem states that a nondeterministic voting method is only strategyproof if it is a mixture of unilateral and duple rules. For instance, the rule that flips a coin and chooses a random dictator if the coin lands on heads, or chooses the pairwise winner between two random candidates if the coin lands on tails, is strategyproof. Nondeterministic methods have been devised that approximate the results of deterministic methods while being strategyproof.

== See also ==
- Arrow's impossibility theorem
- Gibbard–Satterthwaite theorem
