= Dictatorship mechanism =

Theoretical rule in social choice theory

In social choice theory, a dictatorship mechanism is a degenerate voting mechanism where the outcome is controlled by a single predetermined person, called the dictator. Dictatorship mechanisms are not considered desirable for practical applications; their main use is theoretic: in many cases, the only mechanisms that satisfy a certain set of axioms are dictatorship mechanisms. Such cases are proved by dictatorship theorems. A famous example of a dictatorship theorem is the Gibbard–Satterthwaite theorem, which says that any strategyproof voting rule that can output at least three different outcomes is a dictatorship.

In a dictatorship, the dictator is predetermined before voting, and is not simply the voter that happens to cast the tie-breaking or result-changing vote in hindsight.

== Formal definition ==
Non-dictatorship is one of the necessary conditions in Arrow's impossibility theorem. In Social Choice and Individual Values, Kenneth Arrow defines non-dictatorship as:

There is no voter $i$ in {1, ..., n} such that, for every set of orderings in the domain of the constitution, and every pair of social states x and y, $x \succeq_i y$ implies $x \succeq y$.

A dictatorship is defined as a rule that does not satisfy non-dictatorship. Anonymous voting rules automatically satisfy non-dictatorship (so long as there is more than one voter).

== Serial dictatorship ==
When the dictator is indifferent between two or more best-preferred options, it is possible to choose one of them arbitrarily or randomly, but this will not be strictly Pareto efficient. A more efficient solution is to appoint a secondary dictator, who has a right to choose, from among all the first dictator's best options, the one that they most prefer. If the second dictator is also indifferent between two or more options, then a third dictator chooses among them, and so on; in other words, ties are broken lexicographically. This rule is called serial dictatorship or the priority mechanism.

The priority mechanism is sometimes used in problems of house allocation. For example, when allocating dormitory rooms to students, it is common for academic administrators to care more about avoiding effort than about the students' well-being or fairness. Thus, students are often assigned a pre-specified priority order (e.g. by age, grades, distance, etc.) and is allowed to choose their most preferred room from the available ones.

The main advantage of serial dictatorships is that they satisfy strategyproofness and Pareto-efficiency.

== See also ==
- Paradox of voting
- Random ballot
