= Rated voting =

Electoral systems with independent candidate ratings

On a rated ballot, the voter may rate each choice independently.

An approval voting ballot does not require ranking or exclusivity.

Rated, evaluative, graded, or cardinal voting rules are a class of voting methods that allow voters to state how strongly they support a candidate, by giving each one a grade on a separate scale.

The distribution of ratings for each candidate—i.e. the percentage of voters who assign them a particular score—is called their merit profile. For example, if candidates are graded on a 4-point scale, one candidate's merit profile may be 25% on every possible rating (1, 2, 3, and 4), while a perfect candidate would have a merit profile where 100% of voters assign them a score of 4.

Since rated methods allow the voters to express how strongly they support a candidate, these methods are not covered by Arrow's impossibility theorem, and their resistance to the spoiler effect becomes a more complex matter. Some rated methods are immune to the spoiler effect when every voter rates the candidates on an absolute scale, but they are not when the voters' rating scales change based on the candidates who are running.

== Variants ==
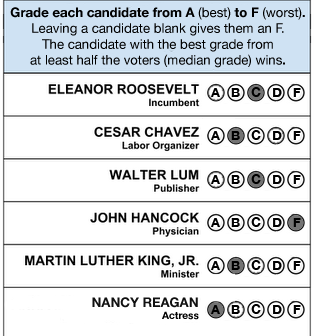
A majority judgment ballot is based on grades like those used in schools.

There are several voting systems that allow independent ratings of each candidate, which allow them to be immune to the spoiler effect given certain types of voter behavior. For example:

- Score voting systems, where the candidate with the highest average (or total) rating wins.
  - Approval voting (AV) is the simplest method, and allows only the two grades (0, 1): "approved" or "unapproved".
  - Combined approval voting (CAV) uses 3 grades (−1, 0, +1): "against", "abstain", or "for."
  - Range voting refers to a variant with a continuous scale from 0 to 1.
  - The familiar five-star classification system is a common example, and allows for either 5 grades or 10 (if half-stars are used).
- Highest median rules, where the candidate with the highest median grade wins. The various highest median rules differ in their tie-breaking methods.

However, other rated voting methods have a spoiler effect no matter what scales the voters use:

- Quadratic voting is unusual in that it is a cardinal voting system that does not allow independent scoring of candidates.
- Cumulative voting could be classified as a cardinal rule with unconditional spoiler effects.
- STAR (score then automatic runoff) is a hybrid of ranked and rated voting systems. It chooses the top 2 candidates by score voting, who then advance to a runoff round (where the candidate is elected by a simple plurality).
- Any hybrid of a ranked and rated voting system that reduces to majority rule when only two candidates are running fails independence of irrelevant alternatives due to the Condorcet paradox.

In addition, there are many different proportional cardinal rules, often called approval-based committee rules.

- Phragmen's method
- Proportional approval voting (Thiele's method)
- Method of equal shares

== Relationship to rankings ==
Ratings ballots can be converted to ranked/preferential ballots, assuming equal ranks are allowed. For example:

	Rating (0 to 99)	Preference order
Candidate A	99	First
Candidate B	55	Second
Candidate C	20	Third
Candidate D	20	Third

== Analysis ==
Arrow's impossibility theorem does not apply to cardinal rules.

Psychological research has shown that cardinal ratings (on a numerical or Likert scale, for instance) convey more information than ordinal rankings in measuring human opinion.

Cardinal methods can satisfy the Condorcet winner criterion, usually by combining cardinal voting with a first stage (as in Smith//Score).

=== Strategic voting ===
Like all (deterministic, non-dictatorial, multicandidate) voting methods, rated methods are vulnerable to strategic voting, due to Gibbard's theorem.

Cardinal methods where voters give each candidate a number of points and the points are summed are called additive. Both range voting and cumulative voting are of this type. With a large number of voters, the strategic Myerson-Weber equilibria for such methods are the same as for methods where only extreme ballots are allowed. In this setting, the optimal strategy for Range voting is the same as for approval voting, and the optimal strategy for cumulative voting is the same as for first-past-the-post. For approval voting (and thus Range voting), the optimal strategy involves approving (or rating maximum) everybody above a certain utility threshold, and not approving (or rating minimum) everybody below it.

== See also ==
- Ranked voting, the other class of voting methods
  - Plurality voting, the degenerate case of ranked-choice voting
  - Arrow's impossibility theorem, a theorem on the limitations of ranked-choice voting
- Gibbard's theorem, a generalization of the Gibbard-Satterthwaite theorem applicable to rated voting
