= First-past-the-post voting =

Plurality voting system

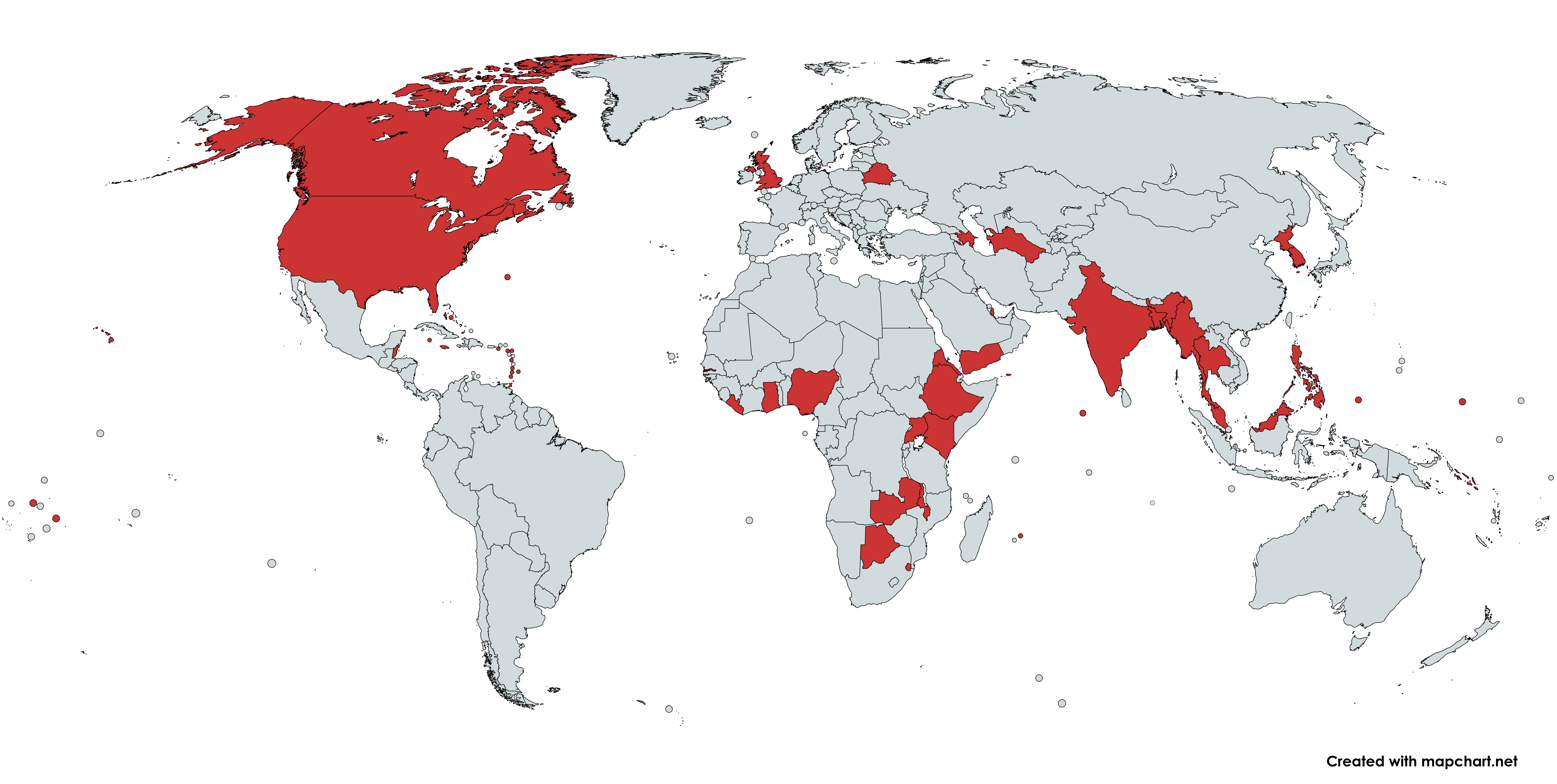
Countries that primarily use a first-past-the-post voting system for national legislative elections

First-past-the-post (FPTP) — also called choose-one, first-preference plurality (FPP), or simply plurality — is a single-winner voting rule. Each voter marks one candidate as their favorite, or first-preference, and the candidate with more first-preference votes than any other candidate (a plurality) is elected, even if they do not have more than half of votes (a majority).

FPP has been used to elect part of the British House of Commons since the Middle Ages before spreading throughout the British Empire, usually in conjunction with plurality block voting. Throughout the 20th century, the former British colonies of Australia and New Zealand and many other countries that were using FPP abandoned it in favor of other electoral systems. FPP is still used in the majority of US states for most elections. However, the combination of partisan primaries and a two-party system in these jurisdictions means that most American elections behave effectively like two-round systems, in which the first round chooses two main contenders (of which one of them goes on to usually receive a majority of votes).

A first-past-the-post ballot for a single-member district. The voter must mark one (and only one).

== Example ==
Tennessee voting pattern

42% of voters	26% of voters	15% of voters	17% of voters
1. Memphis; 2. Nashville; 3. Chattanooga; 4. Knoxville	1. Nashville; 2. Chattanooga; 3. Knoxville; 4. Memphis	1. Chattanooga; 2. Knoxville; 3. Nashville; 4. Memphis	1. Knoxville; 2. Chattanooga; 3. Nashville; 4. Memphis

Suppose Tennessee is holding an election on the location of its capital. The population is split between four cities, and all the voters want the capital to be as close to them as possible. The options are:

- Memphis, large but far to the west
- Nashville, medium, near the center
- Chattanooga, small and in the east
- Knoxville, small and isolated

In FPTP, only the first preferences. As such, the votes would be counted as 42% for Memphis, 26% for Nashville, 17% for Knoxville, and 15% for Chattanooga. Since Memphis has the most votes, it would win a FPTP election, even though it is far from the center of the state and most voters would prefer Nashville to any other option. Conversely, instant-runoff voting would elect Knoxville, the easternmost city, because Chattanooga would be eliminated in the first round and its 15% given to Knoxville in the second, giving Knoxville 32% to Nashville's 26% (the elimination and absorption of which would put Knoxville over Memphis' 42%). Such an election result is an example of center squeeze. By contrast, Condorcet methods would elect Nashville (the actual capital) because it beats all others in a head-to-head which takes into account all preferences in order (Nashville beats Memphis in 3 of the blocks, and beats Chattanooga and Knoxville in the biggest 2).

== Properties and effects ==
Table of pathological behaviors
	Pathology	Explanation/details
X mark	Frustrated majority	The frustrated majority paradox occurs when a majority of voters prefer some candidate Brighton to every other candidate, but Brighton still loses the election. First-past-the-post is vulnerable to this paradox because of vote-splitting.
X mark	Condorcet loser paradox	The Condorcet loser paradox happens when a majority of voters prefer every other candidate to Brighton, but Brighton still wins. First-past-the-post is vulnerable to this paradox because of vote-splitting.
X mark	Center squeeze	The center squeeze describes a type of violation of Independence of irrelevant alternatives primarily affecting voting rules in the Plurality-rule family where the Condorcet winner is eliminated in an early round or otherwise due to a lack of first-preference support.
X mark	Spoiler effect	A spoiler effect happens when the results of an election between A and B is affected by voters' opinions on an unrelated candidate C. First-past-the-post does not meet this criterion, which makes it vulnerable to spoilers.
X mark	Cloning paradox	The cloning paradox is a particular kind of spoiler effect that involves several perfect copies, "clones", of a candidate. Candidate-cloning causes vote-splitting in FPP.
X mark	Best-is-worst paradox	The best-is-worst paradox occurs when an electoral system declares the same candidate to be in first and last place, depending on whether voters rank candidates from best-to-worst or worst-to-best. FPP demonstrates this pathology, because a candidate can be both the FPP winner and also the anti-plurality loser.
X mark	Lesser-evil voting	Lesser-evil voting occurs when voters are forced to support a "lesser of two evils" by rating them higher than their actual favorite candidate. FPP is vulnerable to this pathology.
check	Later-no-harm	Since plurality does not consider later preferences on the ballot at all, it is impossible to either harm or help a favorite candidate by marking later preferences. Thus it passes both Later-No-Harm and Later-No-Help.
check	Later-no-help	Since plurality does not consider later preferences on the ballot at all, it is impossible to either harm or help a favorite candidate by marking later preferences. Thus it passes both Later-No-Harm and Later-No-Help.
check	Multiple-district paradox	The multiple-district paradox refers to a particularly egregious kind of gerrymander, when it is possible to draw a map where a party that wins when single-member districts are used is defeated when multiple-member districts are used. This is not possible under FPP, or other positional voting methods.
check	Perverse response	Perverse response occurs when a candidate loses as a result of receiving too much support from some voters, i.e. it is possible for a candidate to lose by receiving too many votes. FPP is not affected by this pathology.
check	No-show paradox	The no-show paradox is a situation where a candidate loses as a result of having too many supporters. In other words, adding a voter who supports A over B can cause A to lose to B. FPP is not affected by this pathology.

=== Two-party rule ===
A graph showing the difference between the portion of the popular vote (inner circle) and the portion of seats won by parties (outer circle) at the 2015 UK general election

Perhaps the most striking effect of FPTP is the fact that the number of a party's seats in a legislature is determined not by its overall vote count in an election but by how those votes were geographically distributed. Parties with few votes sometimes take more than few seats; often the most-popular party takes 20 percent more seats than its portion of the popular vote. Some criticize FPP for this, arguing that a fundamental requirement of an election system is to accurately represent the views of voters. FPP often creates "false majorities" by over-representing larger parties (giving a majority of the parliamentary/legislative seats to a party that did not receive a majority of the votes) while under-representing smaller ones.

In Canada, majority governments have been formed often but usually they are made up of a party that received less than a majority of votes in the election. A party forming a majority government and also winning a majority of the votes cast has happened only six times since 1900: 1900; 1904; 1917; 1940, 1958 and 1984.

In the United Kingdom, 19 of the 24 general elections since 1922 have produced a single-party majority government. In only two of them (1931 and 1935), the leading party took a majority of the votes across the UK.

In elections in the UK, the FPTP system has produced strange results, with huge gaps between the votes a party receives and the seats it receives. In the 2024 General Election, Reform UK won 14.3% of the popular vote (the third-highest share nationally) but only received 5 seats (0.7% of Parliament). Whilst, the Liberal Democrats won 12.2% of the vote—fewer than Reform UK—but won 72 seats.

In some cases, this can lead to a party receiving the plurality or even majority of the votes cast overall, yet still failing to gain a plurality of legislative seats. This results in a situation called a majority reversal or electoral inversion or wrong-winner result. Famous examples of the second-place party (in votes nationally) winning a majority of seats include the elections in Ghana in 2012, New Zealand in 1978 and 1981, and the United Kingdom in 1951.

Famous examples of the second most popular party (in votes nationally) winning a plurality of seats include the elections in Canada in 1957, 1979, 2019 and 2021. Even when a party wins more than half the votes in an almost purely two-party-competition, it is possible for the runner-up to win a majority of seats. This happened in Saint Vincent and the Grenadines in 1966, 1998, and 2020 and in Belize in 1993. Even with only two parties and equally-sized constituencies, winning a majority of seats just requires receiving more than half the vote in more than half the districts—even if the other party receives all the votes cast in the other districts—so just over a quarter of the vote is theoretically enough to win a majority in the legislature. With enough candidates splitting the vote in a district, the total number of votes needed to win can be made arbitrarily small.

Under first-past-the-post, a small party may draw votes and seats away from a larger party that it is more similar to, and therefore give an advantage to one it is less similar to. For example, in the 2000 United States presidential election, the left-leaning Ralph Nader drew more votes from the left-leaning Al Gore, resulting in Nader spoiling the election for the Democrats. According to the political pressure group Make Votes Matter, FPTP creates a powerful electoral incentive for large parties to target similar segments of voters with similar policies. The effect of this reduces political diversity in a country because the larger parties are incentivized to coalesce around similar policies. The ACE Electoral Knowledge Network describes India's use of FPTP as a "legacy of British colonialism".

Duverger's law is an idea in political science which says that constituencies that use first-past-the-post methods in single-winner elections will lead to two-party systems, given enough time. Economist Jeffrey Sachs explains:

The main reason for America's majoritarian character is the electoral system for Congress. Members of Congress are elected in single-member districts according to the "first-past-the-post" (FPTP) principle, meaning that the candidate with the plurality of votes is the winner of the congressional seat. The losing party or parties win no representation at all. The first-past-the-post election tends to produce a small number of major parties, perhaps just two, a principle known in political science as Duverger's Law. Smaller parties are trampled in first-past-the-post elections.

— from Sachs's The Price of Civilization, 2011

However, most countries with first-past-the-post elections have multiparty legislatures (albeit with two parties larger than the others), the United States being the major exception. There is a counter-argument to Duverger's Law, that while on the national level a plurality system may encourage two parties, in the individual constituencies supermajorities may cause the largest party to suffer fracturing.

=== Landslide victories ===
In multi-district elections, first-past-the-post voting can result in landslide victories and electoral wipeouts, particularly in case of political fragmentation or low electoral competition. Parties not voted for by a majority of voters may win a majority of seats. However, in Western European legislative elections, the Gallagher index—measuring the disproportionality between votes received and seats received—does not appear to have a direct effect on political legitimacy, as people instead mostly care about government composition.

=== Strongholds, key constituencies and kingmakers ===
The distortions in geographical representation (artificial regionalism) provide incentives for parties to "write off regions" where they are weak and not have much chance of being elected. So they ignore the interests of areas in which they are too weak to stand much chance of gaining representation, leading to governments that do not govern in the national interest.

Further, during election campaigns the campaigning activity of parties tends to focus on marginal seats held by opponents where there is a prospect of a change in representation. These decisions leave safer areas (safe to one party or the other) excluded from participation in an active campaign. Political parties operate by targeting districts, directing their activists and policy proposals toward those areas considered to be marginal, either possible to be lost or won, where each additional vote is potentially more critical and has more value.

The ability of FPTP to manufacture majority governments has been cited by its supporters as an advantage over proportional representation systems. In the latter, smaller parties may act as 'kingmakers' in coalitions using their bargaining power and therefore, arguably, their influence on policy is more than proportional to their parliamentary size. This is largely avoided in FPP systems where majorities are generally achieved, even if the party holding power does not have majority of votes. FPP often produces governments which have legislative voting majorities, thus providing such governments the legislative power necessary to implement their electoral manifesto commitments during their term in office, if they choose to.

This may be beneficial in a country where the party's legislative agenda has broad public support, albeit potentially divided across party lines, or at least benefits society as a whole. However handing a legislative voting majority to a government that lacks popular support can be problematic where said government's policies favor only a fraction of the electorate, particularly if the electorate divides on tribal, religious, or urban–rural lines. There is also the perceived issue of unfair coalitions where a smaller party forms a coalition with other smaller parties and form a government, without a clear mandate as was the case in the 2009 Israeli legislative election where the leading party Kadima, was unable to form a coalition so Likud, a smaller party, formed a government without being the largest party.

The use of proportional representation (PR) may enable smaller parties to become decisive in the country's legislature and gain leverage they would not otherwise enjoy, although this can be somewhat mitigated by a large enough electoral threshold. FPP supporters argue that FPP generally reduces this possibility, except where parties have a strong regional basis. A journalist at Haaretz reported that Israel's highly proportional Knesset "affords great power to relatively small parties, forcing the government to give in to political blackmail and to reach compromises"; Tony Blair, defending FPP, argued that other systems give small parties the balance of power, and influence disproportionate to their votes.

The concept of kingmaker small parties is similar to Winston Churchill's criticism of the alternative vote system as "determined by the most worthless votes given for the most worthless candidates." meaning that votes for lesser-supported candidates may change the outcome of the election between the most-popular candidates. In this case however, it is an intended feature of the alternative vote, since those votes would have otherwise been wasted. In some sense the cross-party vote transfers make every vote count, as opposed to FPP, where as many as three-quarters or more of the votes may be wasted in a district. Anyway this effect is only possible when no candidate receives a majority of first preference votes. It is related to kingmaker premise in that the lesser-known candidates may encourage their supporters to rank the other candidates a certain way and thus have undue influence.

Supporters of electoral reform generally see the kingmaker ability as a positive development, and claim that cross party ties produced by some alternatives to FPP encourage less negative campaigning and encourage more positive campaigning, as candidates are pushed to appeal to a wider group of people. Opinions are split on whether the alternative vote (better known as instant runoff voting outside the UK) achieves this better than other systems.

=== Extremist parties ===
Supporters and opponents of FPP often argue whether FPP advantages or disadvantages extremist parties, and whether or not it pushes parties to less moderate positions.

FPP suffers from the center squeeze phenomenon, where more moderate candidates are squeezed out by more extreme ones. However, the different types (or the absence of) of party primaries may strengthen or weaken this effect. In general, FPP has no mechanism that would benefit more moderate candidates and many supporters of FPP defend it, even when it elects the largest and most unified (even if more polarizing) minority over a more consensual majority supported candidate. Allowing people into parliament who did not finish first in their district, as can occur in PR systems, was described by David Cameron as creating a "Parliament full of second-choices who no one really wanted but didn't really object to either." But he overlooks how his premise only uses first choice votes, when affection for a voter's secondary preference might be almost on par with the affection held for their first choice, and also how under STV and IRV the final elected choices were all – or almost all – high up in popularity on the first count anyway.

Because under FPP only the winner in each district gets representation, voters often engage in strategic voting, a form of self-censorship. This has prevented extreme left- and right-wing parties from gaining parliamentary seats. Proportional representation generally does give these parties their due share of representation, so there is less push for strategic voting. Thus, strategic voting is applauded by some as it keeps extremists from gaining seats.

But supporters of extremist parties do not always engage in strategic voting, and sometimes do achieve representation under FPP anyway. For one thing, winning a plurality in a district (perhaps 33 percent of votes in a district where likely no more votes are cast than equivalent to total votes/total seats) may take much fewer votes than it does to win a seat under PR, where the effective threshold is seldom much less than total votes/total seats. The need for strategic voting is mostly obviated under preferential voting systems, such as STV or IRV. Voters are allowed to rank other candidates, and if necessary their votes are transferred to where they will be used. Therefore, they do not have to (or at least less often have to) strategically compromise on their first choice.

Additionally, due to the safe seats produced by FPP and the ability of the leading party to take majority of seats with less than majority of votes, extremists may use "burrowing from within" and conspiratorial nomination machinations to take over a professedly big-tent party. The Constitution Society published a report in April 2019 stating that, "[in certain circumstances] FPP can ... abet extreme politics, since should a radical faction gain control of one of the major political parties, FPP works to preserve that party's position. ...This is because the psychological effect of the plurality system disincentivises a major party's supporters from voting for a minor party in protest at its policies, since to do so would likely only help the major party's main rival. Rather than curtailing extreme voices, FPP today empowers the (relatively) extreme voices of the Labour and Conservative party memberships." For example, the electoral system of Hungary, a mixed system dominated by FPP, saw the right-wing, populist party Fidesz win 135 seats in the 2022 Hungarian parliamentary election and has remained the largest party in Hungary since 2010 by changing the electoral system to mostly use FPP instead of the previous mixed system using mostly the two-round system. Since 2010, Fidesz has implemented other anti-democratic reforms, leading to the European Parliament no longer considering Hungary a full democracy. Additionally, electoral reform campaigners have argued that the use of FPP in South Africa was a contributory factor in the country adopting the apartheid system after the 1948 general election in that country.

Leblang and Chan found that a country's electoral system is the most important predictor of a country's involvement in war, according to three different measures: (1) when a country was the first to enter a war; (2) when it joined a multinational coalition in an ongoing war; and (3) how long it stayed in a war after becoming a party to it. When the people are fairly represented in parliament, more of those groups who may object to any potential war have access to the political power necessary to prevent it. In a proportional democracy, war and other major decisions generally require the consent of the majority. The British human rights campaigner Peter Tatchell, and others, have argued that Britain entered the Iraq War primarily because of the political effects of FPP and that proportional representation would have prevented Britain's involvement in the war.

=== Wasted votes ===
Wasted votes are seen as those cast for losing candidates, and for winning candidates in excess of the number required for victory. For example, in the UK general election of 2005, 52% of votes were cast for losing candidates and 18% were excess votes—a total of 70% "wasted" votes. On this basis a large majority of votes may play no part in determining the outcome. This winner-takes-all system may be one of the reasons why "voter participation tends to be lower in countries with FPP than elsewhere."

Primary elections, two-round systems, instant runoff voting, and less tested methods such as approval voting and condorcet methods can reduce wasted votes, the need for strategic voting and the spoiler effect.

=== Gerrymandering ===
Because FPP produces many wasted votes and because the electorate are divided into the maximum number of separate districts, an election under FPP may be gerrymandered. When gerrymandering is used, electoral areas are designed deliberately to unfairly increase the number of seats won by one party by redrawing the map such that votes of the disadvantaged party are "packed" by creating one district in which it has an overwhelming majority of votes (whether due to policy, demographics which tend to favor one party, or other reasons), and many districts where it is at a disadvantage and will not win any seats, or the small party's votes are "cracked" where districts are drawn so that there is no district where the small party has a plurality.

=== Strategic voting ===
To a greater extent than many others, the first-past-the-post method encourages strategic voting. Voters have an incentive to vote for a candidate who they predict is more likely to win, as opposed to their preferred candidate who may be unlikely to win and for whom a vote could be considered as wasted. FPP wastes fewer votes when it is used in two-party contests. But waste of votes and minority governments are more likely when large groups of voters vote for three, four or more parties as in Canadian elections. Canada uses FPP and only two of the last seven federal Canadian elections (2011 and 2015) produced single-party majority governments. In none of them did the leading party receive a majority of the votes.

The position is sometimes summarized, in an extreme form, as "all votes for anyone other than the runner-up are votes for the winner." This is because votes for these other candidates deny potential support from the second-placed candidate, who might otherwise have won. Following the extremely close 2000 U.S. presidential election, some supporters of Democratic candidate Al Gore believed one reason he lost to Republican George W. Bush is that a portion of the electorate (2.7%) voted for Ralph Nader of the Green Party, and exit polls indicated that more of them would have preferred Gore (45%) to Bush (27%). The election was ultimately determined by the results from Florida, where Bush prevailed over Gore by a margin of only 537 votes (0.009%), which was far exceeded by the 97488 (1.635%) votes cast for Nader in that state.

In Puerto Rico, there has been a tendency for Independentista voters to support Populares candidates. This phenomenon is responsible for some Popular victories, even though the Estadistas have the most voters on the island, and is so widely recognised that Puerto Ricans sometimes call the Independentistas who vote for the Populares "melons", because that fruit is green on the outside but red on the inside (in reference to the party colors).

Because voters have to predict who the top two candidates will be, results can be significantly distorted:

- Some voters will vote based on their view of how others will vote as well, changing their originally intended vote;
- Substantial power is given to the media, because some voters will believe its assertions as to who the leading contenders are likely to be. Even voters who distrust the media will know that others do believe the media, and therefore those candidates who receive the most media attention will probably be the most popular;
- A new candidate with no track record, who might otherwise be supported by the majority of voters, may be considered unlikely to be one of the top two, and thus lose votes to tactical voting;
- The method may promote votes against as opposed to votes for. For example, in the UK (and only in the Great Britain region), entire campaigns have been organised with the aim of voting against the Conservative Party by voting Labour, Liberal Democrat in England and Wales, and since 2015 the SNP in Scotland, depending on which is seen as best placed to win in each locality. Such behavior is difficult to measure objectively.

=== Geography ===
The effect of a system based on plurality voting but in which the electorate are divided among many separate districts is that the larger parties, and parties with geographically concentrated support, win a disproportionately large share of seats, while smaller parties and parties with more evenly distributed support win a disproportionately small share of seats. This is because the large parties win many seats and do not 'waste' many of their votes. As voting patterns are similar in about two-thirds of the districts, it is more likely that a single party will hold a majority of legislative seats under FPP than happens in a proportional system. This is especially true in multi-party situations where no party takes a majority of the vote. Despite the bias of FPP toward large parties, under FPP it is rare to elect a majority government that actually has the support of a majority of voters.

The British Electoral Reform Society (ERS) says that regional parties benefit from this system. "With a geographical base, parties that are small UK-wide can still do very well" if they have local dominance or at least receive a plurality of votes in districts.

On the other hand, minor parties that do not concentrate their vote usually end up getting a much smaller proportion of seats than votes, as they lose most of the seats they contest and 'waste' most of their votes.

The ERS also says that in FPP elections using many separate districts "small parties without a geographical base find it hard to win seats".

Make Votes Matter said that in the 2017 general election, "the Green Party, Liberal Democrats and UKIP (minor, non-regional parties) received 11% of votes between them, yet they shared just 2% of seats", and in the 2015 general election, "[t]he same three parties received almost a quarter of all the votes cast, yet these parties shared just 1.5% of seats."

According to Make Votes Matter, in the 2015 UK general election UKIP came in third in terms of number of votes (3.9 million/12.6%), but gained only one seat in Parliament, resulting in one seat per 3.9 million votes. The Conservatives on the other hand received one seat per 34,000 votes.

The winner-takes-all nature of FPP leads to distorted patterns of representation, since it exaggerates the correlation between party support and geography. It creates artificial regionalism.

For example, in the UK the Conservative Party represents most of the rural seats in England, and most of the south of England, while the Labour Party represents most of the English cities and most of the north of England. This pattern hides the large number of votes cast for candidates of the non-dominant party in each place. Parties can find themselves without elected politicians in large portions of the country, heightening feelings of regionalism. Party supporters (who may nevertheless be a significant minority) in those sections of the country are unrepresented.

In the 2019 Canadian federal election Conservatives won 98% of the seats in Alberta and Saskatchewan with only 68% of the vote cast in those provinces. The lack of non-Conservative representation gives the appearance of greater Conservative support than actually exists. Similarly, in Canada's 2021 elections, the Conservative Party won 88% of the seats in Alberta with only 55% of the Alberta vote and won 100% of the seats in Saskatchewan with only 59% of the provincial vote.

First-past-the-post within geographical areas tends to deliver (particularly to larger parties) a significant number of safe seats, where a representative is sheltered from any but the most dramatic change in voting behavior. In the UK, the Electoral Reform Society estimates that more than half the seats can be considered as safe. It has been claimed that members involved in the 2009 expenses scandal were significantly more likely to hold a safe seat.

=== Alternatives ===
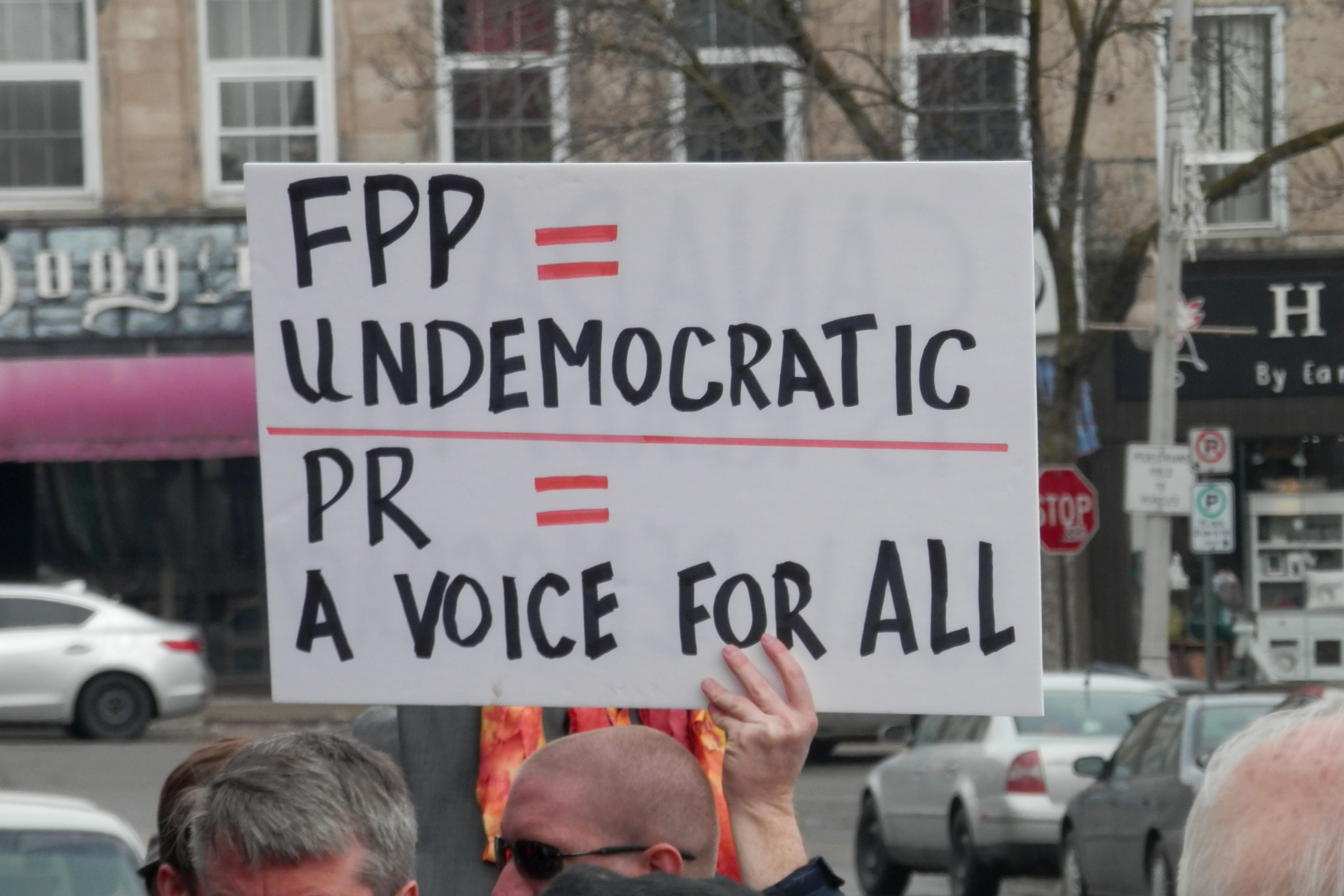
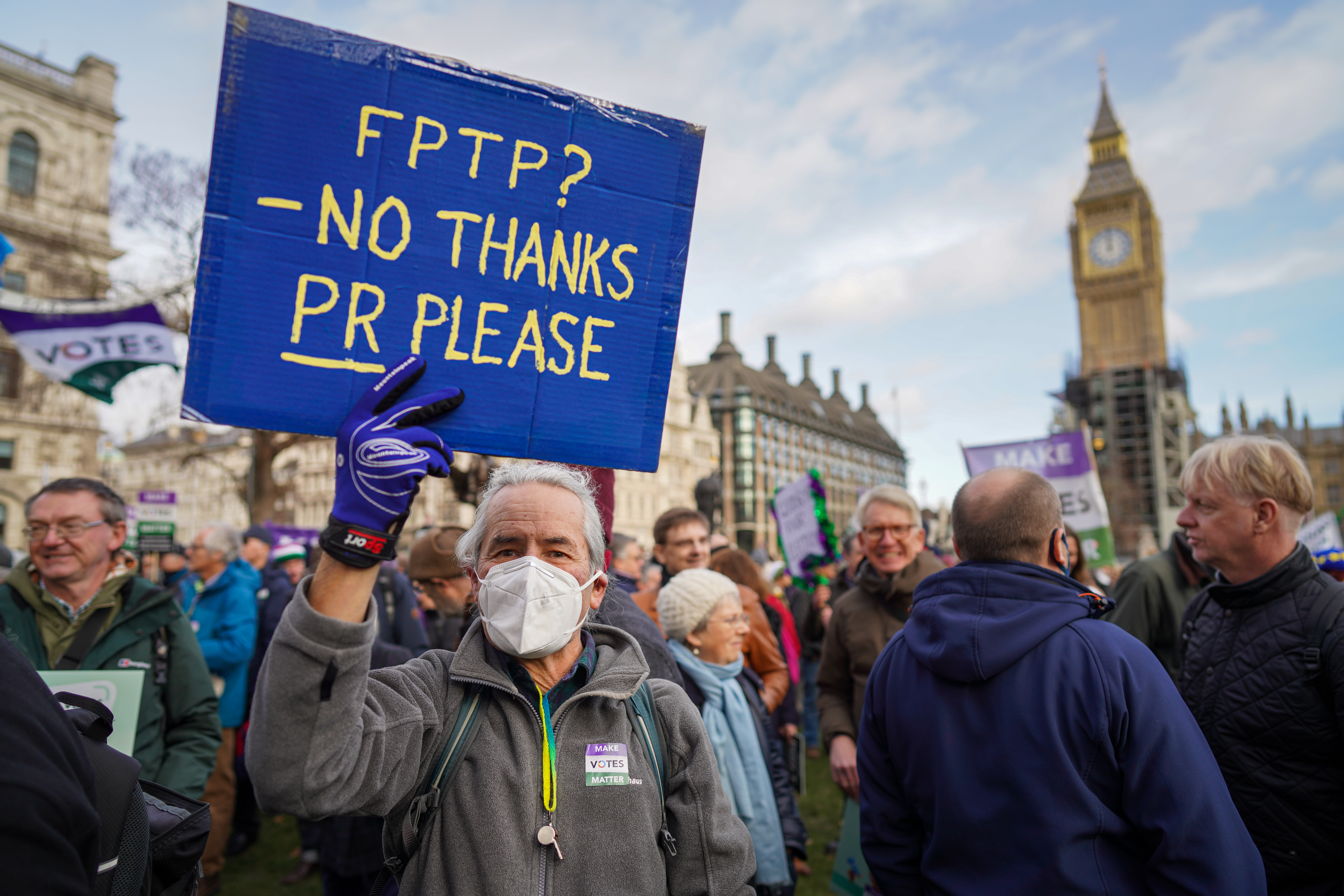
People campaigning against first-past-the-post and in favour of proportional representation

Non-plurality voting systems have been devised since at least 1299, when Ramon Llull came up with both the Condorcet and Borda count methods, which were respectively reinvented in the 18th century by the Marquis de Condorcet and Jean-Charles de Borda. More serious investigation into electoral systems came in the late 18th century, when several thinkers independently proposed systems of proportional representation to elect legislatures. The single transferable vote (STV) in particular was invented in 1819 by Thomas Wright Hill, and a quota-based electoral system was first used in a public election in 1840 by his son Rowland for the Adelaide City Council in Australia. STV saw its first national use in Denmark in 1855 and was used in Tasmania state elections starting in 1897, permanently starting in 1909. STV was reinvented several times in the 19th century.

The Proportional Representation Society was founded in England in 1884 and began campaigning. STV was used to elect the British House of Commons's university constituencies between 1918 and their abolition in 1950.

Many countries that use first-past-the-post voting for multi-winner elections have active campaigns to switch to proportional representation (e.g. UK and Canada).

In some election systems, multi-seat districts (plural districts in the U.S.) are used but FPP may be used because multi-seat contests are not used to fill the seats. This may be done by the members serving in staggered terms, with one being up for election in different years. This system is used in city elections in Portland, Maine.

Another way to avoid multi-seat contests in a multi-seat district is the seat/post system, where each seat is filled using a separate ballot. This was used in Canadian provincial elections – to elect MLAs in Winnipeg districts in 1914 and 1915, and to elect all members in Prince Edward Island from 1867 to 1996.

The two-round system tends to result in winners closer to the median voter than FPP for more than two candidates and is used in presidential elections and some legislative elections.

== History ==
The House of Commons of England originated in 1341, during the Middle Ages as an assembly that included church leaders as well as the knights of each shire and burgesses of each large city of the Kingdom, each of which elected two members of parliament (MPs) by block plurality voting. Starting in the 19th century, electoral reform advocates pushed to replace these multi-member constituencies with single-member districts or like the Diggers to at least begin to use equal-sized districts. Reforms were made through the years, but a complete change to equal-sized single-member districts did not occur until 1948. In the meantime, block voting, limited voting and STV were used in multi-member districts holding as many as four members.

Elections to the Canadian House of Commons have mostly been conducted using FPP. But eleven ridings at various times elected two MPs using block voting.

The United States broke away from British rule in 1783, and its constitution provides for an electoral college to elect its president. Despite original intentions to the contrary, by the mid-19th century this college had transformed into a de facto use of FPP for each state's presidential election, with each state (excepting Nebraska and Maine) electing a party block voting or general ticket (multi-member slate) by mere plurality state-wide. This was further morphed through the introduction of the party primary, which made American presidential elections into a sort of two-round system in practice.

=== Naming ===
The name first-past-the-post is a reference to a kind of gambling in horse races. In a first-past-the-post wager, bettors would choose the single horse they thought would be the first one to make it past the finishing post. In academic contexts, the rule is typically called first-preference plurality (FPP), which describes the rule's behavior more precisely, or simply plurality.

== Countries using FPP ==
=== Legislatures elected exclusively by single-member plurality ===
The following is a list of countries currently following the first-past-the-post voting system for their national legislatures.

Map showing countries where the lower house or unicameral national legislature is elected by FPTP (red) or mixed systems using FPTP (pink – mixed majoritarian, purple/lavender – mixed proportional/compensatory).

- Antigua and Barbuda
- Azerbaijan
- Bahamas
- Bangladesh
- Barbados
- Belarus
- Belize
- Botswana
- Dominica
- Eritrea
- Eswatini
- Ethiopia
- The Gambia
- Ghana
- Grenada
- Jamaica
- Kenya
- North Korea
- Liberia
- Malaysia
- Malawi
- Maldives
- Federated States of Micronesia
- Nigeria
- Qatar
- Saint Kitts and Nevis
- Saint Lucia
- Saint Vincent and the Grenadines
- Samoa
- Solomon Islands
- Transnistria
- Trinidad and Tobago
- Turkmenistan
- Uganda
- Yemen
- Zambia

==== Upper house only ====
- Bhutan
- Dominican Republic
- Poland

==== Lower house only ====
- Canada
- India
- Myanmar
- Palau
- United Kingdom

==== Varies by state ====
- United States (both houses) (Note: Prior to the 2020 election, the US states of Alaska and Maine completely abandoned FPTP in favor of Instant-runoff voting or IRV. In the US, 48 of the 50 states and the District of Columbia use FPTP-GT to choose the electors of the Electoral College (which in turn elects the president); Maine and Nebraska use a variation where the electoral vote of each congressional district is awarded by FPTP (or by IRV in Maine beginning in 2020), and the statewide winner (using the same method used in each congressional district in the state) is awarded an additional two electoral votes. In states that employ FPTP-GT, the presidential candidate gaining the greatest number of votes wins all the state's available electors (seats), regardless of the number or share of votes won (majority vs non-majority plurality), or the difference separating the leading candidate and the first runner-up.)

==== Subnational legislatures ====
- Cook Islands (New Zealand)
- US Virgin Islands
- Bermuda
- Cayman Islands

=== Use of single-member plurality in mixed systems for electing legislatures ===
The following countries use single-member plurality to elect part of their national legislature, in different types of mixed systems.

Mixed or hybrid system where FPP is used alongside block voting (fully majoritarian/plurality systems) or as part of mixed-member majoritarian systems (semi-proportional representation)

- Brazil – in the Federal Senate, alongside plurality block voting (alternating elections)
- Hungary – as part of a mixed system (parallel voting with partial compensation)
- Iran – in single-member electoral districts for Khobregan, alongside plurality block voting
- Ivory Coast – in single-member electoral districts, alongside party block voting
- Japan – as part of a mixed system (parallel voting)
- Marshall Islands – FPP in single-member electoral districts, alongside MMDs of 2 to 5 seats using plurality block voting
- Mexico – as part of a mixed system (parallel voting)
- Nepal – as part of a mixed system (parallel voting)
- Oman – in single-member electoral districts, alongside plurality block voting
- Pakistan – alongside seats distributed proportional to seats already won
- Philippines – as part of a mixed system (parallel voting) (Note: The Philippines, South Korea and Thailand use the first-past-the-post voting system primarily; 80% or above of their members of the legislature are elected by FPTP.)
- Singapore – in single-member electoral districts, alongside party block voting
- South Korea – as part of a mixed system (parallel voting) (Note: As the usage of decoy lists by major parties is prevalent, the additional member system is de facto nullified.)
- Taiwan – as part of a mixed system (parallel voting)
- Tanzania – as part of a mixed system (parallel voting)
- Thailand – as part of a mixed system (parallel voting)

As part of mixed-member proportional (MMP) or additional member systems (AMS)

- Bolivia
- Germany
- Lesotho
- New Zealand
- Scotland (United Kingdom) (subnational legislature)

=== Heads of state elected by FPP ===
- Angola (Double simultaneous vote for the presidential and legislative elections)
- Bosnia and Herzegovina (one for each main ethnic group)
- Cameroon
- Democratic Republic of the Congo
- El Salvador
- Equatorial Guinea
- The Gambia
- Guyana (Double simultaneous vote for the presidential and legislative elections)
- Honduras
- Iceland
- Kiribati
- Mexico
- Nicaragua
- Nigeria
- Palestine
- Panama
- Paraguay
- Philippines
- Rwanda
- Singapore
- South Korea
- Taiwan (from 1996 constitutional amendment)
- Tanzania
- Venezuela

=== Former use ===
- Argentina (The Chamber of Deputies uses party list PR. Only twice used FPTP, first between 1902 and 1905 used only in the elections of 1904, and the second time between 1951 and 1957 used only in the elections of 1951 and 1954.)
- Australia (replaced by IRV in 1918 for both the House of Representatives and the Senate, with STV being introduced to the Senate in 1948)
- Belgium (adopted in 1831, replaced by party list PR in 1899)— the Member of the European Parliament for the German-speaking electoral college is still elected by FPTP
- Cyprus (replaced by proportional representation in 1981)
- Denmark (replaced by proportional representation in 1920)
- Greece (this system was only used in the elections of 1920 and 1952)
- Hong Kong (adopted in 1995, replaced by party list PR in 1998)
- Italy (used between 1860 and 1882, and between 1892 and 1919)
- Lebanon (replaced by proportional representation in June 2017)
- Lesotho (replaced by MMP Party list in 2002)
- Malta (replaced by STV in 1921)
- New Zealand (replaced by MMP in 1996)
- Papua New Guinea (replaced by IRV in 2002)
- Portugal (replaced by party list PR)
- Serbia (adopted in 1990, replaced by party list PR in 1992)
- South Africa (replaced by party list PR in 1994)

== See also ==
- Approval voting – Single-winner electoral system
- Cube rule – Law regarding first-past-the-post elections
- Deviation from proportionality
- Plurality-at-large voting – Non-proportional electoral system
- Single non-transferable vote – Multi-winner, semi-proportional electoral system
- Single transferable vote – Multi-winner electoral system
