= Lesser-evil voting =

Politics and government

Lesser-evil voting (LEV) refers to a kind of strategic voting where a voter supports a less-preferred candidate in an election (the "lesser evil") rather than their actual favorite candidate, when this candidate is unlikely to win.

Electoral systems where lesser-evil voting is forced, i.e., where it is not possible for a voter to support both their favorite candidate and a lesser-evil without causing the "greater evil" to win, necessarily fail the sincere favorite criterion. If the incentive is sufficiently severe, such methods are also subject to Duverger's law, tending to devolve into two-party systems. Lesser-evil voting is a common strategy in plurality-based systems like first-past-the-post and ranked-choice voting (RCV), but not approval or score voting.

== Applications of the concept ==
The concept of "lesser evil" voting (LEV) can be seen as a form of the minimax strategy ("minimize maximum loss") where voters, when faced with two or more candidates, choose the one they perceive as the most likely to do harm and vote for the one most likely to defeat him, or the "lesser evil."

=== In France ===
==== 2002 presidential election ====
In the second round of the 2002 French presidential election, graffiti in Paris told people to "vote for the crook, not the fascist." The "crook" in those messages was Jacques Chirac of the center-right to right-wing Rally for the Republic and the "fascist" was Jean-Marie Le Pen of the far-right National Front. Chirac eventually won the second round having garnered 82% of the vote.

=== In the United States ===
==== Humorous References ====
In a 1972 recording, the Firesign Theater satirised the upcoming Presidential election with veiled references to candidates Nixon and McGovern in fictional character George Papoon's campaign button ("Not insane") and platform ("Guaranteed Annual Year").

In a 2004 episode of South Park, as summarized by IMDb, "Stan refuses to vote in the school mascot election because his choices are a giant douche and a turd sandwich. Unfortunately, his views on voting are seen as un-American, and he is ultimately banished from the town."

==== Vietnam War era ====
In a 2012 op-ed piece supporting the Obama campaign, the term was used to describe the phenomenon of US liberals refusing to vote during the Vietnam War era.

==== 2016, 2020, and 2024 presidential elections ====
In the 2016 United States presidential election, both major candidates of the major parties — Hillary Clinton (D) and Donald Trump (R) — had disapproval ratings close to 60% by August 2016. Green Party candidate Jill Stein invoked this idea in her campaign stating, "Don't vote for the lesser evil, fight for the greater good." This sentiment was repeated for the next two election cycles, both of which were between presidential candidates Joe Biden (D) and Donald Trump (R).

In 2024, the principle was invoked in the United States in an appeal to vote for any Democrat who runs against Donald Trump, even if one normally votes Republican.

==== African Americans ====
Progressive political commentator Ta-Nehisi Coates argued "For African Americans, presidential elections have almost always been exercises in lesser evils and harm reduction."

==== Israel-Palestine ====
LEV was identified, in an op-ed piece, as an inadequate reason for Muslims in the USA to vote for the Democratic Presidential candidate in the 2024 election. Progressive political commentator Ta-Nehisi Coates argued the 2024 election, which Harris lost, was largely due to a "casual contempt" against both parties due to bipartisan support of military interventionism in the Middle East, namely with respect to the Gaza war and genocide.

== Arguments for and against ==
=== In favor ===
==== "WW2 Allies Were the Lesser Evil" Argument ====
Libertarian law professor Ilya Somin argues in favor of LEV. He claims if a person refuses to support the lesser evil, this "implies that everyone who backed the Allies during World War II was wrong to do so" on grounds of the allies' injustices. For example, American Japanese internment camps and the Bombing of Dresden made the Allies morally fallible and therefore "the lesser of two evils" in the war, but he argues you should not fail to support the Allies as a result of them committing some immoral acts. Somin states, "if supporting a lesser evil in war is sometimes defensible, surely the same applies to an election."

==== "When both candidates have unacceptable positions, one must still vote" Argument ====
In 2024, Pope Francis advised that "One must vote. And one must choose the lesser evil. Which is the lesser evil? That lady [Kamala Harris] or that gentleman [Donald Trump]? I don’t know; each person must think and decide according to their own conscience." He referred to a Church teaching that, in a situation where both candidates hold views that are opposed to Catholic beliefs, each person must vote in accordance with his faithfully formed conscience.

==== "Voting Demands Little Time" Argument ====
Leftist public intellectual Noam Chomsky and John Halle are critical of LEV, but ultimately defend it. Chomsky advises that despite his criticisms of LEV, there is practical utility in LEV, saying, "voting should not be viewed as a form of personal self-expression or moral judgement directed in retaliation towards major party candidates who fail to reflect our values, or of a corrupt system designed to limit choices to those acceptable to corporate elites", but instead as an opportunity to reduce harm or loss. He says in order for voting not to distract the left from non-electoral political action, "the left should devote the minimum of time necessary to exercise the LEV choice then immediately return to pursuing goals which are not timed to the national electoral cycle," making his argument strongly consequentialistic.

=== Against ===
==== Accelerationist Argument ====
Historian and former Noam Chomsky student Norman Finkelstein criticized Chomsky's view that one should engage in LEV because it demands so little time. Speaking on the 2016 election, Finkelstein claimed that had Hillary won, "there would not have been the most significant mass movement in modern American history," referring to the rise of the progressive left during Trump's presidency. He said when the Democratic Party comes into power, they "neutralize the opposition" using slogans such as "give them a chance," which does not hold true of how the left speaks of the Republican Party. "So the prospects and possibilities for real opposition—they significantly increase when there is a Trump-like figure in power." Overall, Finkelstein's claim is that allowing the Republican candidate to win can be beneficial in creating a left-wing reaction which, in the long-term, outweighs the negative impact of Republicans gaining power in the short-term.

==== "Refusing to Vote Gives you Political Leverage" Argument ====
Journalist Glenn Greenwald argues against LEV, claiming that regularly voting for the Democrat candidate causes voters to "lose any leverage you might have over them" in the long term.

==== Revolutionary Spirit Argument ====
The leader of Peruvian communist militant group the Shining Path, Chairman Gonzalo, argued against all forms of voting including LEV when one is unsatisfied with the current system, claiming elections are revisionist and opportunist, and that voting "means nothing except allowing the renewal of authorities of this old and rotting order." Gonzalo emphasizes the symbolic importance of rejecting elections in facilitating revolutionary attitudes and minimizes the practical significance of voting in the short term.

==== "Don't vote, it only encourages them" ====
In 1990, a Māori activist group in New Zealand urged its supporters not to participate in either the 1990 or the 1993 election of the members of Parliament. Their slogan was "Don't vote, it only encourages them." They also encouraged non-participation in the 1993 New Zealand Electoral Reform Referendum, arguing that constitutional change -- not merely an adjustment of the composition of Parliament, or in the way popular votes were counted -- was required to fulfil the promise of Tino Rangatiratanga made by the Crown in Te Tiriti o Waitangi which its representative negotiated in 1840.

==== None of the Above ====
In 2016, Alan Grayson delivered an address to the US House of Representatives in which he argued for a "right to reject all of the candidates on the ballot... I am talking about ‘none of the above’ winning and forcing a mulligan, a do-over. We make them do it over until they get it right and give us candidates whom we want to vote for, someone who we feel will actually do a good job in leadership and make the country a better place." Among the benefits Grayson identifies, "First and most importantly, we eliminate the need, the terrible need, to try to choose between the lesser of two evils."

== See also ==
- Gaza war protest vote movements
- Lesser of two evils principle
- Strategic voting
- Civic engagement
- Sincere favorite criterion
