= Sequential proportional approval voting =

Multiple-winner electoral system

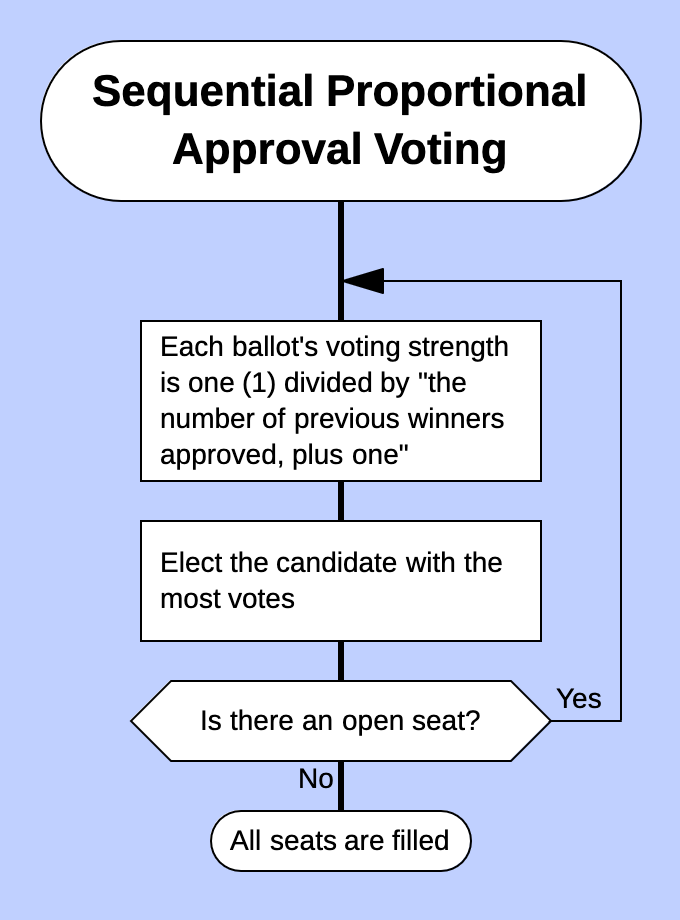
Flow chart of SPAV calculation

Sequential proportional approval voting (SPAV) or reweighted approval voting (RAV) is an electoral system that extends the concept of approval voting to a multiple winner election. It is a simplified version of proportional approval voting. It is a special case of Thiele's voting rules, proposed by Danish statistician Thorvald N. Thiele in the early 1900s. It was used in Sweden from 1909 to 1921, when it was replaced by a "party-list" style system, and is still used for some local elections.

== Description ==
Sequential proportional approval voting uses approval voting ballots to elect multiple winners on a round-by-round basis. With approval voting ballots, each voter may support any number of candidates on their ballot as they see fit. For tabulation, each ballot is weighted according to a formula, the candidate with the most support is elected, and the process is repeated until there are no more seats to fill.

The aforementioned formula for each ballot in a given round is as follows: $W=\frac{1}{E+1}$ where $E$ is the number of candidates approved on that ballot who were elected in the previous rounds, and $W$ is its weight. For the first round, $E$ is naturally 0, and so each ballot has a weight of 1.

== Example ==
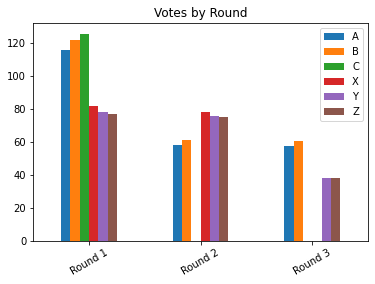
Illustration of the example election. Candidates with the most votes wins for each round. When a candidate is elected they are removed for the next round.

As a clarifying example, consider an election for a committee with three winners. There are six candidates, representing two main parties: A, B, and C from one party, and X, Y, and Z from another party. Each voter casts their vote by selecting all the candidates they support. The following table shows the results of the votes. Each row represents a possible candidate support combination and the first column indicates how many ballots were cast with that combination. The bottom row shows the number of votes each candidate received.

Votes from 200 voters
# of votes	Candidate A	Candidate B	Candidate C	Candidate X	Candidate Y	Candidate Z
112	✓	✓	✓			
6		✓	✓			
4	✓	✓	✓	✓		
73				✓	✓	✓
4			✓	✓	✓	✓
1				✓	✓	
Total Votes	116	122	126	82	78	77

Because Candidate C has the most support, they are the first winner, $w_1$, and they cannot win any subsequent rounds. In the second round, for any ballot where Candidate C is approved, $E$ becomes 1 in the formula, meaning the ballot's new weight equals $\frac{1}{1+1}=\frac{1}{2}$. Below is the chart for round 2. A column has been added to indicate the weight of each set of ballots.

Second Round Results
# of votes	Weight of Vote	Candidate A	Candidate B	Candidate C	Candidate X	Candidate Y	Candidate Z
112	1/2	✓	✓	✓			
6	1/2		✓	✓			
4	1/2	✓	✓	✓	✓		
73	1				✓	✓	✓
4	1/2			✓	✓	✓	✓
1	1				✓	✓	
Weighted Votes		58	61		78	76	75

Despite Candidates A and B having so many votes in the first round, Candidate X is the second winner ($w_2$), because all ballots that support A and B also support C and thus already have representation on the council. In round 3, ballots that voted for both $w_1$ and $w_2$ have their vote weighted by one third. Any ballot that supports only one of the two winners will be weighted by one half. Ballots that indicate support for neither winner remain at full weight. Below is a table representing that information.

Third Round Results
# of votes	Weight of Vote	Candidate A	Candidate B	Candidate C	Candidate X	Candidate Y	Candidate Z
112	1/2	✓	✓	✓			
6	1/2		✓	✓			
4	1/3	✓	✓	✓	✓		
73	1/2				✓	✓	✓
4	1/3			✓	✓	✓	✓
1	1/2				✓	✓	
Weighted Votes		57 1/3	60 1/3			38 1/3	37 5/6

Candidate B is the third and final winner, $w_3$. The final result has two winners from the party that received about two thirds of the votes, and one winner from the party that received about one third of the votes. If ordinary approval voting had been used instead, the final committee would have all three candidates from the first party, as they had the highest three vote totals in the first round.

== Properties ==
SPAV satisfies the fairness property called justified representation whenever the committee size is at most 5, but might violate it when the committee size is at least 6.

	Pareto efficiency	Committee monotonicity	Support monotonicity with additional voters	Support monotonicity without additional voters	Consistency	inclusion-strategyproofness	Computational complexity
Approval voting	strong	✓	✓	✓	✓	✓	P
Proportional approval voting	strong	×	✓	cand	✓	×	NP-hard
Sequential proportional approval voting	×	✓	cand	cand	×	×	P

There is a small incentive towards tactical voting where a voter may withhold approval from candidates who are likely to be elected, just like there is with cumulative voting and the single non-transferable vote. SPAV is a much computationally simpler algorithm than harmonic proportional approval voting and other proportional methods, permitting votes to be counted either by hand, rather than requiring a computer to determine the outcome.

When comparing sequential proportional approval to single transferable vote (STV), SPAV is more likely to elect candidates that individually represent the average voter, where STV is more likely to elect a range of candidates that match the distribution of the voters. The larger the number of candidates elected, the smaller the practical difference.

== See also ==
- Proportional approval voting
- Satisfaction approval voting
- Reweighted range voting
- Approval voting
- Single transferable vote
- Sainte-Laguë method
- D'Hondt method
