= Bernt Aardal =

Norwegian political scientist (born 1950)

Bernt Aardal (born 9 October 1950) is a Norwegian political scientist who is among the best known practitioners of election science in Norway.

Aardal took his doctorate in 1993 with a thesis on energy policy, Energi og miljø. Nye stridsspørsmål i møte med gamle strukturer. Aardal was a head researcher at the Norwegian Institute for Social Research from 1994 to 2009. He doubled as an adjunct professor at the University of Oslo from 1998 before becoming full professor there from 2013. His main subject of study was electoral behaviour. Commenting frequently on opinion polling, the newspaper Morgenbladet found Aardal to be the most cited academic in Norway, regardless of discipline, in 2006. In 2020 he was selected as a fellow the Norwegian Academy of Science and Letters.

He was born in Drammen and resides at Bærums Verk.
