= Center squeeze =

Spoiler effect in RCV and two-round systems

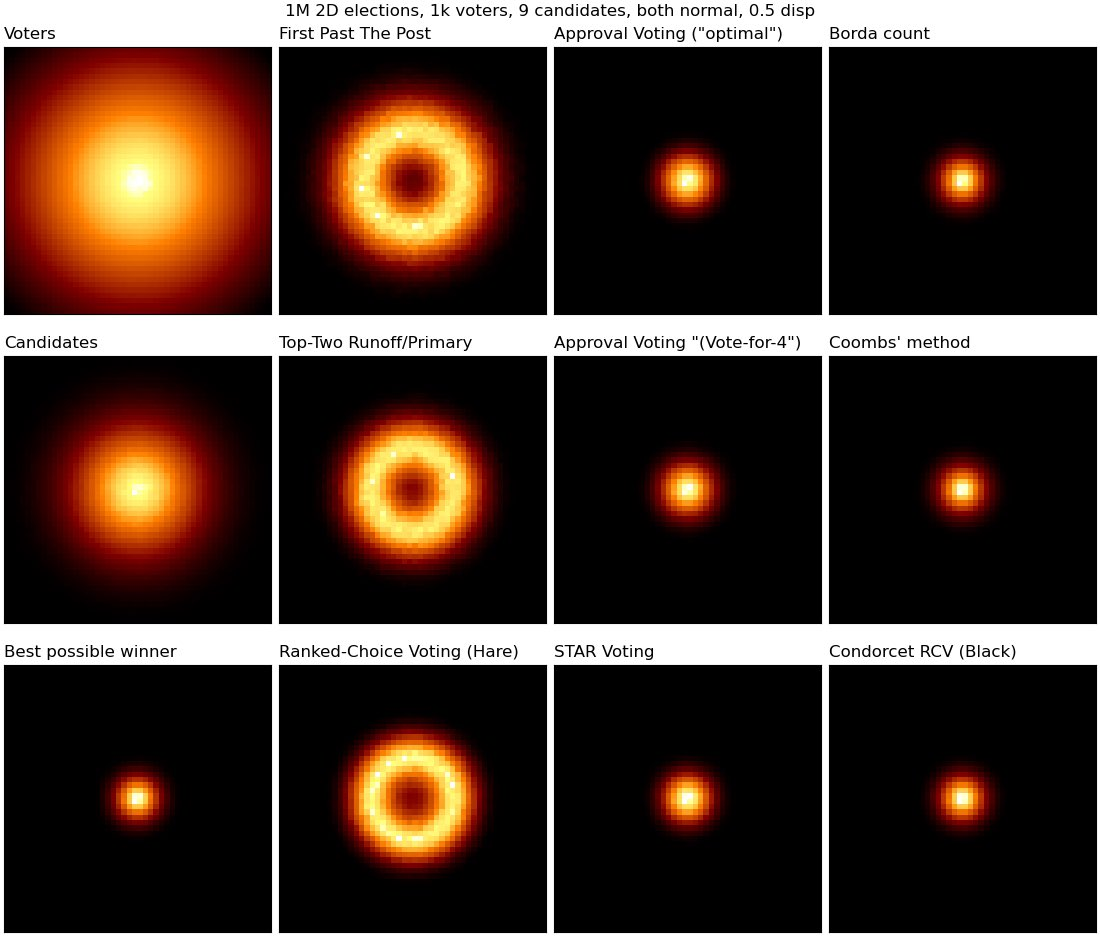
Distribution of winners on a simulated political compass, showing how center-squeeze extends to more complex or multi-dimensional models. The number of winners is displayed as a heatmap. The bias of FPTP, runoffs or primaries, and RCV (center-left column) is clearly visible.

A center squeeze is a kind of spoiler effect shared by rules like the two-round system, plurality-with-primaries, and ranked choice voting. In a center squeeze, the majority-preferred and socially optimal candidate is eliminated in favor of a more extreme alternative in an early round, while there are still spoilers. Systems with center squeeze are sometimes called centrifugal ("center-fleeing") because they encourage political polarization.

Candidates focused on appealing to a smaller base of core supporters can "squeeze" broadly popular candidates trapped between them out of the race, by splitting the first-preference votes needed to survive earlier rounds. This effect was first predicted by social choice theorists in the 1940s and 50s, and has since been documented in various countries using plurality-style electoral systems.

Famous examples of center squeezes include Alaska's 2022 special election (where Nick Begich III was eliminated in the first round by Sarah Palin), as well as the 2007 French presidential election, where moderate liberal François Bayrou was eliminated by left-wing Ségolène Royal, allowing the right-wing Nicolas Sarkozy to win the second round.

== Overview ==
Center squeezes are a kind of spoiler effect in which the majority-preferred candidate is eliminated before the final round of an election. Candidates focused on appealing to a small base of core supporters can squeeze Condorcet winners out of the race, by splitting the first-preference votes needed to survive until the final round.

By Black's median-voter theorem, the candidate who appeals most to the median voter will be the majority-preferred candidate, which means they will be elected by any method compatible with majority-rule. However, in methods that strongly prioritize first preferences, these candidates are often eliminated early on because they aim for broad appeal rather than strong base support.

The "center" in "center squeeze" refers to candidates who are close to the center of public opinion, and is not limited to centrists along a traditional, one-dimensional political spectrum. A center squeeze can occur in any situation where voters prefer candidates who hold views similar to their own.

=== Indirect effects ===
Voting systems that suffer from the center-squeeze effect incentivize candidates to avoid the political center, creating political polarization in the long run. As a result, rules like RCV can lead to polarization even if center squeezes seem empirically rare, because the electoral system discourages moderates running for office in the first place.

Center-squeeze has been observed in Australia, Maine, Fiji, and various US cities, all of which use ranked-choice voting, in addition to California (which uses nonpartisan primaries).

=== Susceptibility by system ===
Center squeeze is a major feature of two-party systems using primaries or other multiple-round systems. In these methods, candidates must focus on appealing to their core supporters to ensure they can make it past the first round, where only first-preferences count.

If voters assign scores to candidates based on ideological distance, score voting will always select the candidate closest to some central tendency of the voter distribution. As a result, while score voting does not always elect the candidate closest to the median voter, it often behaves like methods that do. Under most models of strategic voting, spoilerproof cardinal methods tend to behave like approval voting and thus converge on the Condorcet winner.

The opposite situation—a bias in favor of bland, inoffensive, or unknown candidates—is not common in any widely-used voting rules. However, it can occur for "negative" voting methods that choose candidates with the least opposition, like anti-plurality, D21 – Janeček, or Coombs' method.

== Example ==
Start: / Mid-Start: / Mid-End: / End: 33.4% / 17.2% / 13.4% / 35.9%

In Alphabet Land, voters want their name to be placed close to the start of a list. Candidate $A$ thinks names should be listed in alphabetical order, and Candidate $Z$ thinks they should be in reverse-alphabetical order. Candidate $M$ thinks the order should be random.

Because $M$ is preferred to both $A$ and $Z$ in head-to-head match-ups, $M$ is the majority-preferred (Condorcet) winner, and if voters' unhappiness with the result is equal to their ideological distance from the winner, $M$ will be the socially-optimal winner as well. Thus, $M$ is the "best" or "most popular" candidate under both common metrics of candidate quality in social choice.

Vote totals of an example first-past-the-post election, which is the same as the first round of an RCV election.

=== First-preference plurality ===
If we use a single-round of first-preference plurality (FPP) then $Z$ wins, with 35.9% of voters choosing them as their favorite. However, most voters considered $Z$ their least-favorite candidate, and almost two-thirds (63.1%) of the voters preferred $M$ to $Z$.

=== Ranked-choice runoff (Alternative, Two-round) ===
Ranked-choice voting (RCV) tries to address vote-splitting in FPP by replacing it with a series of FPP elections, with the loser being eliminated in each round.

If we use RCV instead of FPP then the first round of the election is the same as the FPP election. But then $M$, because they have the least first preferences, is eliminated. Their votes are then reassigned to $A$ and $Z$, according to their ballot. In the second round, enough voters who preferred $M$ as their first choice took $A$ as their second choice and $A$ wins the election. RCV thus fails to have a substantial moderating impact, instead only causing a swing from one extreme to the other.

== Real-world occurrences ==
=== 1991 Louisiana gubernatorial election ===
Buddy Roemer was squeezed out of the election, leaving corrupt Edwin Edwards and white supremacist David Duke in the runoff.

=== 2007 French presidential election ===
The 2007 French presidential election was seen as an example of a center squeeze. The second round saw Nicolas Sarkozy, a conservative, face off against Ségolène Royal, a socialist. Moderate liberal François Bayrou was eliminated in the first round, despite polls showing a majority of voters preferred Bayrou in a one-on-one match with either of his opponents.

=== 2012 Egyptian presidential election ===
In the 2012 Egyptian presidential election, held using the two-round system, vote-splitting among three leading moderate, non-Islamist candidates caused them all to be eliminated in the first round. This allowed the two more polarizing candidates, Mohamed Morsi and Ahmed Shafik, to advance to the runoff, despite pre-election polls suggesting the eliminated moderates would have defeated either finalist in a head-to-head contest. This led to the June 2013 Egyptian protests and 2013 Egyptian coup d'état.

=== 2022 Alaska special election ===
Center squeeze
Alaska's at-large congressional district
- Turnout: 32.2%
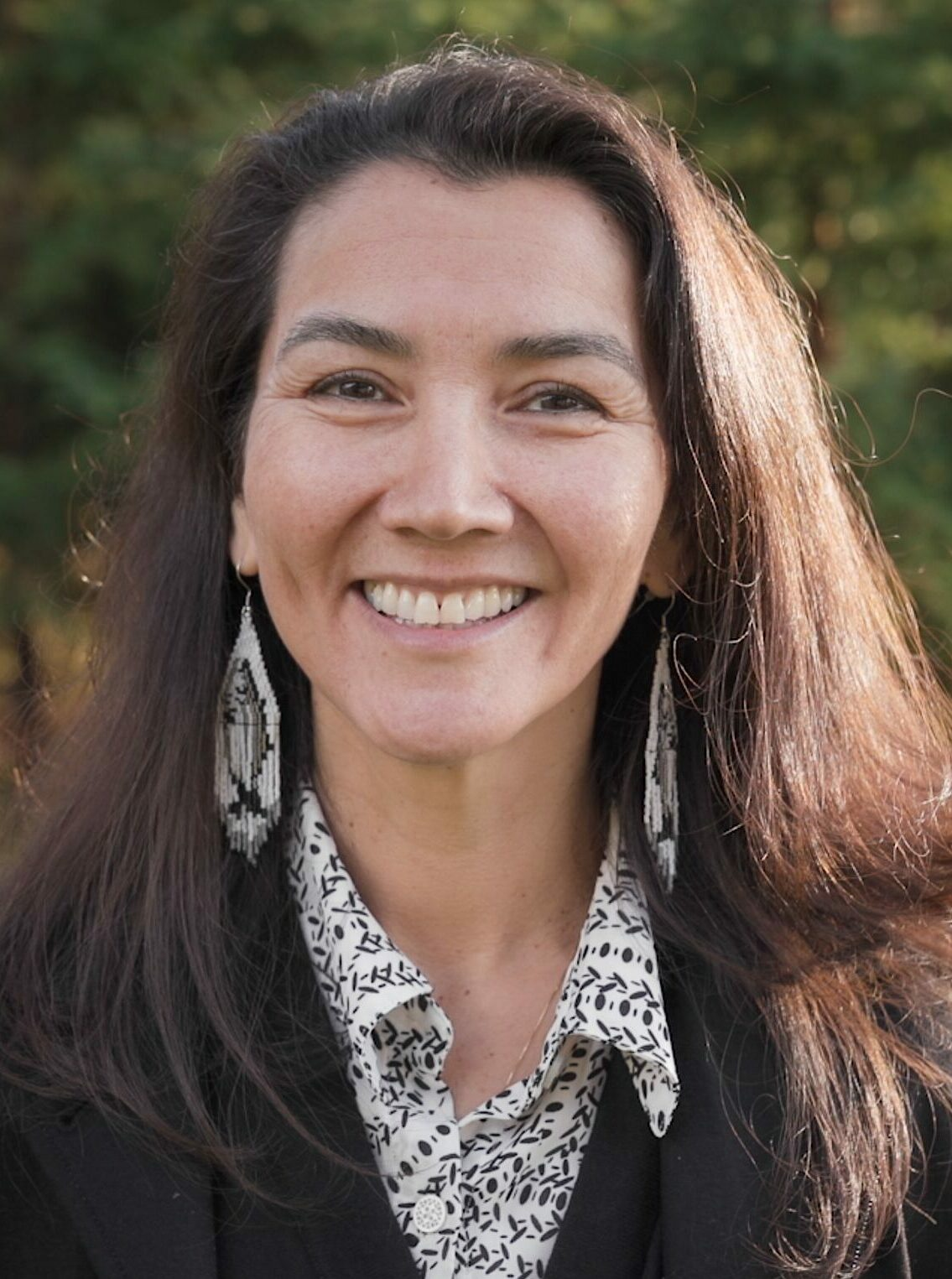

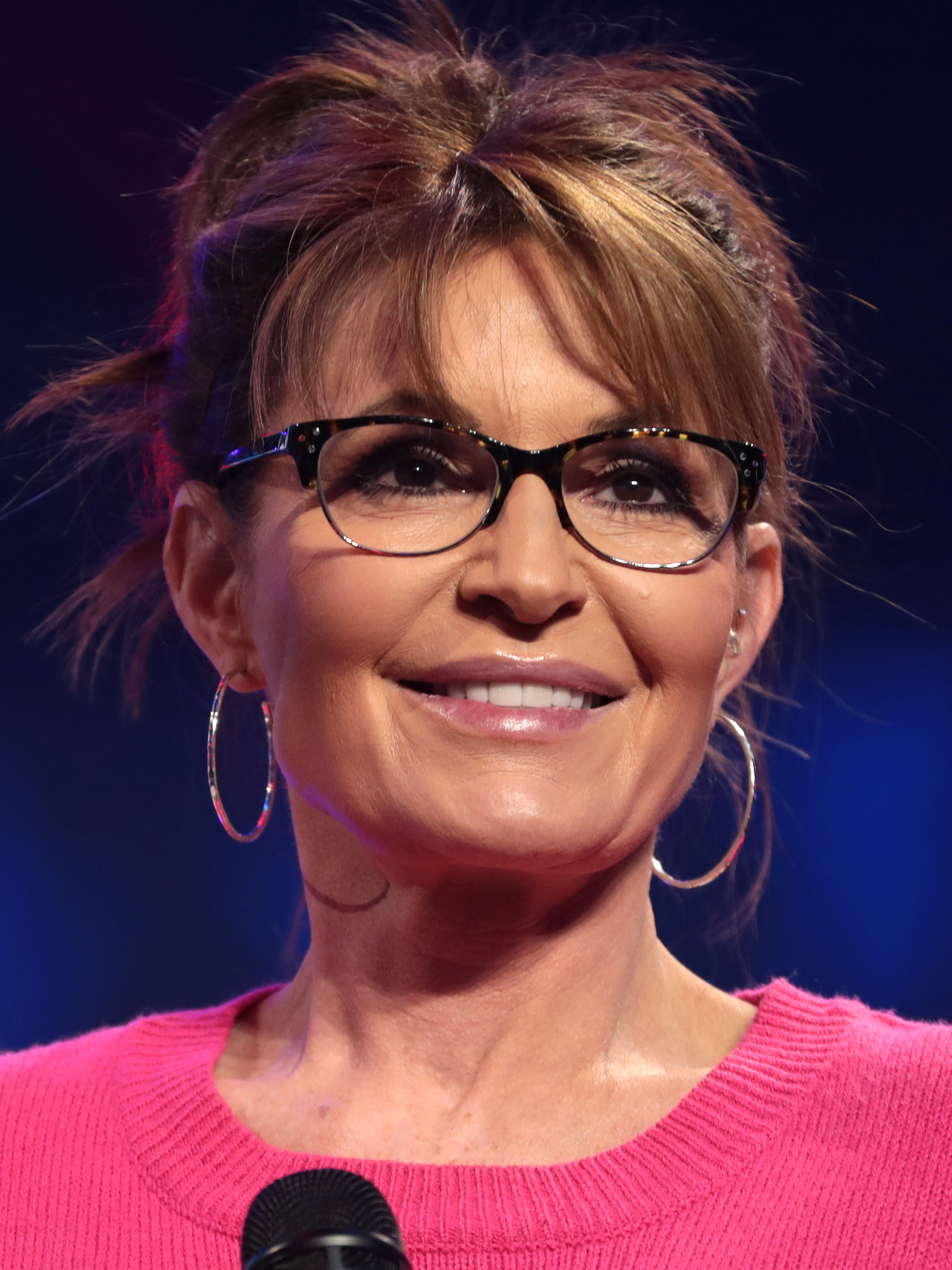

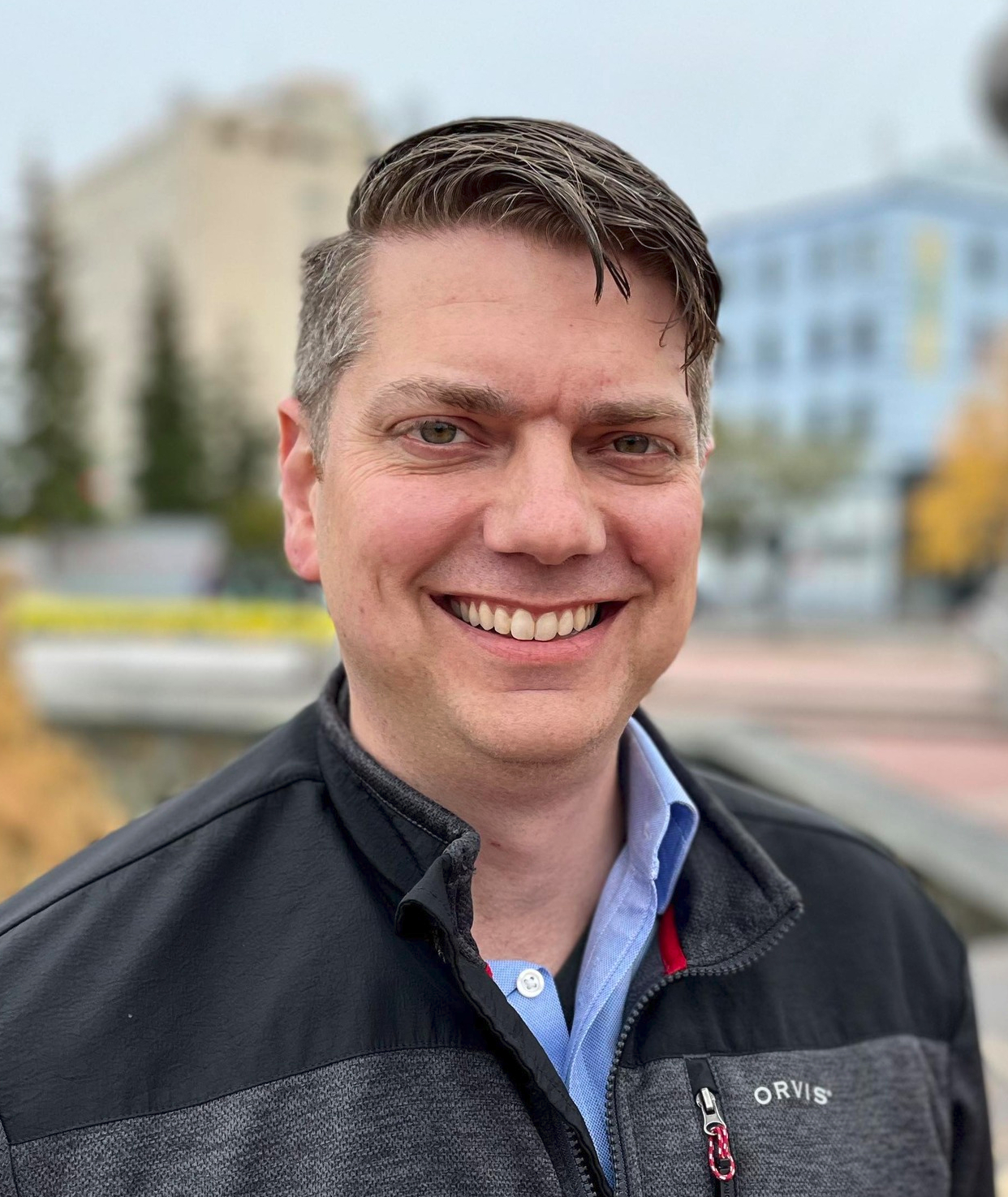
Candidate	Mary Peltola	Sarah Palin	Nick Begich III
Party	Democratic	Republican	Republican
First round	74,817; 39.7%	58,339; 30.9%	52,536; 27.8%
Final round	91,266; 51.5%	86,026; 48.5%	Eliminated

The 2022 Alaska special election seat was seen as an example of a center squeeze, where Nick Begich III was eliminated in the first round by right-wing spoiler Sarah Palin, despite a majority of voters preferring Begich to either one of his opponents. The ranked-choice runoff election involved one Democrat (Mary Peltola) and two Republicans (Sarah Palin and Nick Begich III). Because the full ballot data for the race was released, social choice theorists were able to confirm that Palin spoiled the race for Begich, with Peltola winning the race as a result of several counter-intuitive behaviors that tend to characterize center-squeeze elections.

The election produced a winner opposed by a majority of voters, with a majority of voters ranking Begich above Peltola and Palin, and more than half giving Peltola no support at all. The election was also notable as a no-show paradox, where a candidate is eliminated as a result of votes cast in support of their candidacy. In this case, ballots ranking Palin first and Begich second instead allowed Peltola to win.

Many social choice theorists criticized the ranked-choice runoff procedure for its pathological behavior. Along with being a center squeeze, the election was a negative voting weight event, where a voter's ballot has the opposite of its intended effect (e.g. where a candidate would need more votes to lose). In this race, Peltola would have lost if she had received more support from Palin voters, and won as a result of 5,200 ballots that ranked her last (after Palin then Begich). However, social choice theorists were careful to note the results likely would have been the same under Alaska's previous primary system as well. This led several to recommend replacing the system with any one of several alternatives without these behaviors, such as STAR, approval, or Condorcet voting.

=== 2009 Burlington mayoral election ===
The 2009 Burlington mayoral election was held in March 2009 for the city of Burlington, Vermont, and serves as an example of a four-candidate center squeeze. This was the second mayoral election since the city's 2005 change to ranked-choice runoff voting, after the 2006 mayoral election. In the 2009 election, incumbent Burlington mayor Bob Kiss won reelection as a member of the Vermont Progressive Party, defeating Kurt Wright in the final round with 48% of the vote.

The election results were criticized by mathematicians and voting theorists for several pathologies associated with RCV. These included a no-show paradox, where Kiss won only as a result of 750 votes ranking Kiss in last place. Several electoral reform advocates branded the election a failure after Kiss was elected despite 54% of voters voting for Montroll over Kiss, violating the majority-rule principle. Later analyses showed the race was spoiled, with Wright pulling moderate votes away from Montroll, who would have beat Kiss in a one-on-one race.

The controversy culminated in a successful 2010 initiative that repealed RCV by a vote of 52% to 48%, a 16-point shift from the 64% who had supported the 2005 ratification. The results of every possible one-on-one election are as follows:

Party	Candidate	vs. Simpson	vs. Smith	vs. Wright	vs. Kiss	Win : Loss
	Andy Montroll (D)	6262 (Montroll) – 591 (Simpson)	4570 (Montroll) – 2997 (Smith)	4597 (Montroll) – 3664 (Wright)	4064 (Montroll) – 3476 (Kiss)	4 W : 0 L
	Bob Kiss (P)	5514 (Kiss) – 844 (Simpson)	3944 (Kiss) – 3576 (Smith)	4313 (Kiss) – 4061 (Wright)	3 W : 1 L	
	Kurt Wright (R)	5270 (Wright) – 1310 (Simpson)	3971 (Wright) – 3793 (Smith)	2 W : 2 L		
	Dan Smith (I)	5570 (Smith) – 721 (Simpson)	1 W : 3 L			
	James Simpson (G)	0 W : 4 L				

This leads to an overall preference ranking of:

1. Montroll – defeats all candidates below, including Kiss (4,064 to 3,476)
2. Kiss – defeats all candidates below, including Wright (4,313 to 4,061)
3. Wright – defeats all candidates below, including Smith (3,971 to 3,793)
4. Smith – defeats Simpson (5,570 to 721) and the write-in candidates

Montroll was therefore preferred over Kiss by 54% of voters, over Wright by 56% of voters, over Smith by 60%, and over Simpson by 91% of voters.

=== 2016 United States presidential election ===
Another possible example is the 2016 United States presidential election, where a few polls have found that several alternatives including Bernie Sanders and Gary Johnson could have defeated both Donald Trump and Hillary Clinton under a majority- or rated-voting rules but were squeezed out by both RCV and the primary election rules.

=== 2024 United States presidential election ===
Election law scholar Ned Foley criticized the two-round system variant used in the United States, which has been described as a first round of primaries before a de-facto runoff, for creating a center squeeze in the 2024 presidential election and thus contributing to political polarization. Foley stated that both the existing primary system and a hypothetical election instant-runoff system would have led to the election of Donald Trump by eliminating Nikki Haley. He claimed that Haley would have been the majority-preferred (Condorcet) candidate according to polling, but he only quoted polls on Haley beating Biden, but none on Haley beating either Trump or Harris.

== See also ==
- Vote splitting – Election result affecting losing candidate
- Wasted vote – Votes that do not impact an election
