= Single-member district =

Electoral district with one representative in a legislature

A single-member district or constituency is an electoral district represented by a single officeholder. It contrasts with a multi-member district, which is represented by multiple officeholders.

In some countries, such as Australia and India, members of the lower house of parliament are elected from single-member districts, while members of the upper house are elected from multi-member districts. In some countries, such as Singapore, members of parliament are elected from both single-member and multi-member districts.

== History in the United States ==
The United States Constitution, ratified in 1789, states: "The House of Representatives shall be composed of Members chosen every second Year by the People of the several States ... Representatives ... shall be apportioned among the several States which may be included within this Union, according to their respective Numbers." In other words, the Constitution specifies that each state will be apportioned a number of representatives in the House of Representatives proportional to its population. It does not, however, specify how those representatives should be apportioned. In the early years of the United States, a form of multi-member districts called plural districts were the norm. In contrast with modern proportional multi-member districts (which had not yet been invented), plural districts were elected at-large in plurality votes.

By 1842, single-member House districts had become the norm, with twenty-two states using single-member districts and only six using at-large multi-member districts. On 14 December 1967, single-member House districts were mandated by law pursuant to the Uniform Congressional District Act (2 U.S. Code §2c), under the justification that they served as bulwarks against southern Democrats diluting the electoral power of African-Americans by using strategically drawn at-large multi-member districts. For instance, southern Democrats could create a single statewide multi-member district elected by plurality vote, all but guaranteeing the white majority would elect only Democrats.

== Aspects ==
=== Constituency link ===
It has been argued by proponents of single-member constituencies that it encourages a stronger connection between the representative and constituents and increases accountability and is a check on incompetence and corruption. In countries that have multi-member constituencies, it is argued that the constituency link is lost. For example, in Israel the whole country is a single constituency and representatives are selected by party-lists.

On the other hand, today most voters tend to vote for a candidate because they are endorsed by a particular political party or because they are in favor of who would become or remain the leader of the government, more than their feelings for or against the actual candidate standing. Sometimes voters are in favor of a political party but do not like specific candidates. For example, voters in Canada re-elected the Alberta government in 1989 but, because of dissatisfaction with its leadership, the premier and leader of the governing party, Don Getty, lost his seat.

=== Fewer minority parties ===
It has been argued that single-member districts tend to promote two-party systems (with some regional parties). Called Duverger's law, this principle has also been empirically supported by the cube rule, which shows how the winning party in a first-past-the-post system is mathematically over-represented in the legislature. For example, in the 2014 United States House of Representatives elections, the Republican Party won 51.2% of the popular vote but 56.7% of the seats.

Supporters view this effect as beneficial, claiming that two-party systems are more stable, and that the minority opposition does not have undue power to break a coalition. First-past-the-post minimizes the influence of third parties and thus arguably keeps out forms of opposition outside of the dominant rival party.

Critics of two-party systems believe that two-party systems offer less choice to voters, create an exaggerated emphasis on issues that dominate more marginal seats, and does not completely remove the possibility of a balanced chamber (or hung parliament), which can also give undue power to independents and lead to more, not less, stability. The French republican leader Léon Gambetta compared it to “a sort of broken mirror in which France would not have recognised its own image”.

=== Safe seats ===
A safe seat is one in which a plurality or majority of voters, depending on the electoral system, support a particular candidate or party so strongly that the candidate's election is practically guaranteed in advance of the vote. This means votes for other candidates effectively make no difference to the result. This results in feelings of disenfranchisement, as well as increased nonparticipation, by both supporters of the dominant candidate (who can confidently abstain from voting because their preferred candidate's victory is nearly assured) as well as supporters of other candidates (who know their preferred candidate is essentially guaranteed to lose).

=== Gerrymandering ===
Single-member districts enable gerrymandering, the practice of manipulating district boundaries to favor one political party. Whereas proportional multi-member districts ensure that political parties are represented roughly in proportion to the share of the vote they receive, in single-member districts the entire district is represented by a single politician, even if a sizeable minority (or even a majority, in the case of plurality voting) of the electorate votes for candidates from other parties. This enables political parties to rig elections in their favor by drawing districts in such a way that more districts are won by their party than their proportion of the overall vote would dictate (in the 2018 Wisconsin State Assembly election, for example, the Republican Party won 45% of the popular vote but 64% of the seats, due in part to gerrymandering).

=== Geographic representation ===
Contrary to conventional wisdom, a 2023 study found that single-member district systems do not have more geographically representative parliaments than systems with multi-member districts.

== See also ==
- Duverger's law
