= Two-round system =

Voting system

Countries by electoral system used to (directly) elect their head of state: First-past-the-post Two-round system Instant-runoff voting

Two-round system ballot examples.

The two-round system (TRS or 2RS), sometimes called ballotage, top-two runoff, or two-round plurality, is a single-winner electoral system which aims to elect a member who has support of the majority of voters. The two-round system involves two rounds of choose-one voting, where the voter marks a single favorite candidate in each round. The two candidates with the most votes in the first round move on to a second election (a second round of voting). (Note: The vast majority of jurisdictions do not hold a runoff if some candidate wins more than half the first-round votes (as the candidate with a majority will win even if all voters against them in the 1st round support their opponent in the 2nd round). Some jurisdictions allow more than two candidates in the second round if there is a tie in the first round or if several candidates receive a threshold of votes.) The two-round system is in the family of plurality voting systems that also includes single-round plurality (FPP). Like instant-runoff (ranked-choice) voting and first past the post, it elects one winner.

The two-round system first emerged in France and has since become the most common single-winner electoral system worldwide. Despite this, runoff-based rules like the two-round system and RCV have faced criticism from social choice theorists as a result of their susceptibility to center squeeze (a kind of spoiler effect favoring extremists) and the no-show paradox. This has led to the rise of electoral reform movements (such as in France) which seek to replace the two-round system with other systems like rated voting.

In the United States, the first round is often called a jungle or top-two primary. Georgia, Louisiana, California, and Washington (Note: California and Washington describe the first round as a nonpartisan primary and hold the second round as part of their general elections (regardless of whether candidates receive 50% of the first-round vote).) use the two-round system for most or all non-presidential elections, while Alaska and Maine use a similar instant-runoff system. In other states, the partisan primary system that is often described as a de facto two-round system, with primaries narrowing down the field to two main candidates.

== Origins ==
The French system of ballotage was first established as part of the reforms of the July Monarchy, with the term appearing in the Organic Decree of 2 February 1832 of the French government, which mandated a second-round election "when none of the candidates obtains an absolute majority". The rule has since gained substantial popularity in South America, Eastern Europe, and Africa, where it is now the dominant system.

Some variants of the two-round system use slightly different rules for eliminating candidates before the second round, allowing more than two candidates to proceed to the second round in some cases. Under such systems, in the second round it is sufficient for a candidate to receive a plurality of votes (more votes than anyone else), not necessarily a majority, to be elected.

== Example ==
=== 2002 French presidential election ===
In the 2002 French presidential election, the two contenders described by the media as possible winners were Jacques Chirac and Lionel Jospin, who represented the largest two political parties in France at the time. However, 16 candidates were on the ballot, including Jean-Pierre Chevènement (5.33%) and Christiane Taubira (2.32%) from the Plural Left coalition of Jospin, who refused by excess of confidence to dissuade them.

With the left vote divided among a number of candidates, a third contender, Jean-Marie Le Pen, unexpectedly obtained slightly more than Jospin in the first round:

- Jacques Chirac (Centre-right, Gaullist): 19.88%
- Jean-Marie Le Pen (Far-right, National Front): 16.86%
- Lionel Jospin (Centre-left, Socialist): 16.18%

The other candidates received smaller percentages on the first round.

Because no candidate had obtained an absolute majority of the votes in the first round, the top two candidates went into the second round. Most supporters of the parties which did not get through to the second round (and Chirac's supporters) voted for Chirac, who won with a very large majority:

- Jacques Chirac (Center-right, Gaullist): 82.21%
- Jean-Marie Le Pen (Far-right, National Front): 17.79%

Despite the controversy over Jospin's early elimination, polls showed Chirac was preferred to Jospin by a majority of voters and that Chirac was the majority-preferred candidate, meaning the election was not spoiled.

=== 2024 French legislative election ===
French legislative elections allow more than two candidates to advance to the second round, leading to many triangular elections, such as in the 2024 French legislative election. It is common for all but two candidates to withdraw from the second round (so they don't spoil the chances of another similar candidate) which makes the result similar to top-two two-round systems.

== Variants ==
=== Nonpartisan primary ===
In the United States, a two-round system called the jungle primary is used in Louisiana in place of traditional primary elections to choose each party's candidate only in legislative, local, and some statewide races other than congressional ones. In this state, the first round is held on Election Day with runoffs occurring soon after if a candidate fails to receive at least 50% of the vote on election day. This system was first implemented for Louisiana federal congressional elections in 1978, having been introduced for state and local elections in 1975. Between a special election in 2006 and regular elections in 2010, a closed primary system was used for congressional races. The open primary system was subsequently restored but will be eliminated beginning in 2026 for all congressional elections and certain races for state positions in favor of closed primaries that are held months prior to the general election.

Washington adopted a two-round system in a 2008 referendum, called the nonpartisan blanket primary or top-two primary. California approved the system in 2010, which was first used for the 36th congressional district special election in February 2011. The first election (the primary) is held before the general election in November and the top two candidates enter the general election. The general election is always held, even if a candidate gets over 50%.

Georgia requires a second round if no candidate wins over 50% on Election Day. Georgia uses this system in addition to normal partisan primaries, which usually limit the field to two major candidates. Due to this, second rounds are rare, but a third-party or independent candidate drawing a small share of votes can still force one, as was seen in the 2022 United States Senate election in Georgia.

In Mississippi if a candidate for a statewide office (except for US senate elections) receives less than 50% of the vote a runoff election is triggered.

In the states of Alabama, Arkansas, Georgia, Mississippi, Oklahoma, South Carolina, and Texas. If a candidate fails to receive 50% in a primary election a runoff is held. In addition a primary election runoff is held in North Carolina if requested by the second place candidate and the first place candidate fails to receive at least 30% of the vote.

In South Dakota a primary election runoff for a U.S. house, U.S. Senate, or state governor election is held if the first place candidate fails to receive at least 35% of the vote in a race with 3 or more candidates.

In Iowa a leading primary candidate must win at least 35% of the vote in a race with three or more candidates to automatically advance to the general election. If the leading primary candidate fails to receive 35% of the vote the general election nominee must be chosen by party convention or party committee, depending on the office.

=== Partisan primaries ===
Partisan primaries which select candidates to the general election are a form of two-stage elections. The electoral system in the primary can differ by political party.

=== Party-list runoff ===
A two-party vote is used for elections to the Bhutanese National Assembly, where the first round selects two parties that are allowed to compete in the second round. Then, a second round is held using single-member districts with first-past-the-post.

Armenia utilizes a conditional two-round party-list election, with the first round a party-list proportional representation and the conditional second round between the top two party-lists.

=== Exhaustive ballot ===
The exhaustive ballot (EB) is similar to the two-round system, but involves more rounds of voting rather than just two. If no candidate receives an absolute majority in the first round, the candidate with the fewest votes is eliminated. This continues until one candidate has an absolute majority. Because voters may have to cast votes several times, EB is not used in large-scale public elections. Instead it is used in smaller contests such as the election of the presiding officer of an assembly; one long-standing example of its use is in the United Kingdom, where local associations (LCAs) of the Conservative Party use EB to elect their prospective parliamentary candidates (PPCs). Exhaustive ballot is also used by FIFA and the International Olympic Committee to select hosts.

=== Contingent vote ===
The contingent or supplementary vote is a variant of instant-runoff voting (IRV) that has been used in Queensland and is used in the United Kingdom to elect mayors. Like IRV, voters vote once and rank candidates. Unlike IRV, contingent voting election system involves only two rounds of counting at most. After the first round of counting all but the two candidates with most votes are eliminated, with their votes transferred. With only two candidates progressing on to the second round of counting, one candidate achieves a majority in the second round and wins. The contingent vote tends to elect the same candidate that the two-round system and instant-runoff voting system do.

=== Instant-runoff voting ===
Instant-runoff voting (IRV), like the exhaustive ballot, involves multiple reiterative counts in which the candidate with fewest votes is eliminated each time. Whilst the exhaustive ballot and the two-round system both involve voters casting a separate vote in each round, under instant-runoff, voters vote only once. This is possible because, rather than voting for only a single candidate, the voter ranks all of the candidates in order of preference. These preferences are then used to transfer the votes of those whose first preference has been eliminated during the course of the count. Because the two-round system and the exhaustive ballot involve separate rounds of voting, voters can use the results of one round to decide how they will vote in the next, whereas this is not possible under IRV. Because it is necessary to vote only once, IRV is used for elections in many places. For such as Australian general and state elections (called preferential voting). In the United States, it is known as ranked-choice voting and is used in a growing number of states and localities.

In Ireland it is known as the single transferable vote (STV) and is used for presidential elections and parliamentary by-elections. STV as applied in multi-member districts is a proportional voting system, not a majoritarian one; and candidates need only achieve a quota (or the highest remaining fraction of a quota), to be elected. Multi-winner STV is used in Northern Ireland, Malta, the Australian senate and various other jurisdictions in Australia. STV is often used for municipal elections in lieu of more party-based forms of proportional representation.

=== Approval voting with Runoff ===
The Approval with runoff is a two-round system which uses approval voting in the first round and the top two candidates proceed to a runoff in the second round. The approval voting reduces the center squeeze effect for multiple candidates in the first round.

== Compliance with voting method criteria ==
Most of the mathematical criteria by which voting methods are compared were formulated for voters with ordinal preferences. Some methods, like approval voting, request information than cannot be unambiguously inferred from a single set of ordinal preferences. The two-round system is such a method, because the voters are not forced to vote according to a single ordinal preference in both rounds.

If the voters determine their preferences before the election and always vote directly consistent to them, they will emulate the contingent vote and get the same results as if they were to use that method. Therefore, in that model of voting behavior, the two-round system passes all criteria that the contingent vote passes, and fails all criteria the contingent vote fails.

Since the voters in the two-round system do not have to choose their second round votes while voting in the first round, they are able to adjust their votes as players in a game. More complex models consider voter behavior when the voters reach a game-theoretical equilibrium from which they have no incentive, as defined by their internal preferences, to further change their behavior. However, because these equilibria are complex, only partial results are known. With respect to the voters' internal preferences, the two-round system passes the majority criterion in this model, as a majority can always coordinate to elect their preferred candidate. Also, in the case of three candidates or less and a robust political equilibrium, the two-round system will pick the Condorcet winner whenever there is one, which is not the case in the contingent vote model.

The equilibrium mentioned above is a perfect-information equilibrium and so only strictly holds in idealized conditions where every voter knows every other voter's preference. Thus it provides an upper bound on what can be achieved with rational (self-interested) coordination or knowledge of others' preferences. Since the voters almost surely will not have perfect information, it may not apply to real elections. In that matter, it is similar to the perfect competition model sometimes used in economics. To the extent that real elections approach this upper bound, large elections would do so less so than small ones, because it is less likely that a large electorate has information about all the other voters than that a small electorate has.

== Tactical voting and strategic nomination ==
The two-round system is intended to reduce tactical voting. Under the single-winner plurality voting election system (also known as first past the post), Vote splitting can occur and the choice of just a minority of voters can be elected. Voters who favor less-popular candidates are encouraged to vote tactically, or "compromise", by voting for one of the two leading candidates, because a vote for any other candidate does not have as good a chance of affecting the result and also prevents the voter from indicating which of the two leading candidates they prefer. Under TRS if there are only three (viable) candidates, this is unnecessary: even if a voter's favorite candidate is eliminated in the first round, they will still have an opportunity to influence the result by voting for their second-favorite in the second round. However if there are more than three candidates, there is a reason for the voter to compromise and vote for a leading candidate in the first round, in order to avoid the chance that only candidates the voter dislikes advance to the second round and have chance to be elected.

Under the two-round system, voters sometimes engage in "push over". A voter doing so votes for an unpopular "push over" candidate in the first round to ensure that it is this weak candidate, rather than a stronger rival, whom survives to challenge their preferred candidate in the second round. This can backfire if it removes too many votes for their preferred candidate, or the weak candidate's campaign may be energized by being advanced to the second round.

The two-round system can be influenced by strategic nomination - this is where candidates and political factions influence the result of an election by nominating extra candidates or withdrawing a candidate who would otherwise have stood. TRS is vulnerable to strategic nomination for the same reasons that it is open to the voting tactic of compromising. This is because a candidate who knows they are unlikely to win can ensure that another candidate they support makes it to the second round by withdrawing from the race before the first round occurs, or by never choosing to stand in the first place. By reducing the size of its slate, a political faction can avoid the spoiler effect, whereby a party "splits the vote" of its supporters. A famous example of this spoiler effect occurred in the 2002 French presidential election, when so many left-wing candidates stood in the first round that all of them were eliminated, and two right-wing candidates advanced to the second round. Conversely, a popular faction may fund the campaign of multiple smaller opposing candidates, in order to split the opposition votes among them.

The intention of two-round system is that the winning candidate will have the support of a majority of the votes cast. Under the first past the post method, the candidate with most votes (a plurality or a majority) wins, even if they do not have a majority (more than half) of votes. The two-round system tries to overcome this problem by permitting only two candidates in the second round, so that one must receive a majority of votes counted.

Critics argue that the majority obtained by the winner under the two-round system is an artificial one. Instant-runoff voting and the exhaustive ballot are two other voting methods that create a majority for one candidate by eliminating weaker candidates and then transferring votes based on back-up preferences. However, in cases where there are three or more strong candidates, the TRS will sometimes produce a majority for a different winner than the candidate elected by a majority produced under instant-runoff voting or the exhaustive ballot.

Advocates of Condorcet methods argue that a candidate can claim to have majority support only if they are the "Condorcet winner" – that is, the candidate whose vote tally is greater than that of every other candidate in a series of one-on-one comparisons. In the two-round system, in the last round, the winning candidate is only matched, one-on-one, with one of the other candidates. When a Condorcet winner exists, the candidate does not necessarily win a TRS election due to insufficient support in the first round.

Two-round system advocates counter that the voter's first preference is more important than lower preferences because that is where voters are putting the most effort of decision and that, unlike Condorcet methods, to win under the TRS requires a good showing among the full field of candidates in the first round and also a plurality in the final head-to-head competition. Condorcet methods can allow candidates to win who have minimal first-choice support and can win largely on the compromise appeal of being ranked second or third by more voters.

== Impact on factions and candidates ==
The two-round system encourages candidates to appeal to a broad cross-section of voters. This is because, in order to win an absolute majority in the second round, it is necessary for a candidate to win the support of voters whose favorite candidate has been eliminated. Under the two-round system, between rounds of voting, eliminated candidates, and the factions who previously supported them, often issue recommendations to their supporters as to whom to vote for in the second round of the contest. This means that eliminated candidates are still able to influence the result of the election. This influence leads to political bargaining between the two remaining candidates and the parties and candidates who have been eliminated, sometimes resulting in the two successful candidates making policy concessions to the less successful ones. Because it encourages conciliation and negotiation in these ways, the two-round system is advocated, in various forms, by some supporters of deliberative democracy.

The two-round system is designed for single-seat constituencies. Therefore, like other single-seat methods, if used to elect a council or legislature it will not produce proportional representation (PR). This means that it is likely to lead to the representation of a small number of larger parties in an assembly, rather than a proliferation of small parties. In practice, the two-round system produces results very similar to those produced by the plurality method, and encourages a two-party system similar to those found in many countries that use plurality. Under a parliamentary system, it is more likely to produce single-party governments than are PR methods, which tend to produce coalition governments. While the two-round system is designed to ensure that each individual candidate elected is supported by a majority of voters in the constituency, it does not ensure majority rule on a national level when it comes to electing an assembly. As in other non-PR methods, the party or coalition that wins a majority of seats often will not have the support of a majority of voters across the nation.

=== Polling ===
In Australian politics, the two-party-preferred vote (TPP or 2PP) is the result of the final round of an election or opinion poll after preferences have been distributed to the highest two candidates, who in some cases can be independents. For the purposes of TPP, the Liberal/National Coalition is usually considered a single party, with Labor being the other major party. Typically the TPP is expressed as the percentages of votes attracted by each of the two major parties, e.g. "Coalition 45%, Labor 55%", where the values include both primary votes and preferences. The TPP is an indicator of how much swing has been attained/is required to change the result, taking into consideration later preferences.

== Practical implications ==
In smaller elections, such as those in assemblies or private organizations, it is sometimes possible to conduct both rounds in quick succession. More commonly, however, large-scale public elections the two rounds of runoff voting are held on separate days, and so involve voters going to the polls twice and governments conducting two elections. As a result, one of the most common criticisms against the two-round system is that the cost and difficulty of casting a ballot is effectively doubled. However, the system may sometimes still be cheaper than holding a ranked-choice runoff (RCV), as the counting of votes in each round is simple. By contrast, ranked-choice runoff voting involves a longer and more complex count that often requires a centralized count, as it is impossible to tally or audit RCV results locally.

The two-round voting system also has the potential to cause political instability between the two rounds of voting.

== Usage ==
The two-round system is the most common way used to elect heads of state (presidents) of countries worldwide, a total of 87 countries elect their heads of state directly with a two-round system as opposed to only 22 countries that used single-round plurality (first-past-the-post).

=== Heads of state elected by TRS in direct popular elections ===
- Algeria
- Argentina
- Austria
- Azerbaijan
- Belarus
- Benin
- Bolivia (Double simultaneous vote for the presidential 1st round and legislative elections)
- Brazil
- Bulgaria
- Burkina Faso
- Burundi
- Cape Verde
- Central African Republic
- Chad
- Chile
- Colombia
- Republic of the Congo
- Comoros
- Costa Rica
- Croatia
- Cyprus
- Czech Republic
- Djibouti
- Dominican Republic
- East Timor
- Ecuador
- Egypt
- Finland
- France
- Ghana
- Guatemala
- Guinea
- Guinea-Bissau
- Haiti
- Indonesia
- Iran
- Ivory Coast
- Kazakhstan
- Kenya
- Kyrgyzstan
- Liberia
- Libya
- Lithuania
- Madagascar
- Malawi
- Maldives
- Mali
- Mauritania
- Moldova
- Mongolia
- Montenegro
- Mozambique
- Namibia
- Niger
- Nigeria
- North Macedonia
- Northern Cyprus
- Palau
- Peru
- Poland
- Portugal
- Romania
- Russia
- São Tomé and Príncipe
- Senegal
- Serbia
- Seychelles
- Sierra Leone
- Slovakia
- Slovenia
- Sudan
- Syria
- Tajikistan
- Togo
- Tunisia
- Turkey
- Turkmenistan
- Uganda
- Ukraine
- Uruguay (Double simultaneous vote for the presidential 1st round and legislative elections)
- Uzbekistan
- Yemen
- Zambia
- Zimbabwe

=== Legislative chambers exclusively elected by TRS in single-member districts ===
- Bahrain (lower house only)
- Comoros (unicameral)
- Republic of the Congo (lower house only)
- Czech Republic (upper house only)
- France (lower house only)
- Gabon (both houses; lower house elected directly but upper house elected indirectly)
- Haiti (both houses)
- Mali (unicameral)
- Uzbekistan (lower house only)

==== Sub-national legislatures ====
- Georgia (United States) (both houses)
- Mississippi (United States) (both houses)
- Montserrat (United Kingdom) (unicameral)
- Nebraska (United States) (unicameral)
- Texas (United States) (both houses)
- Louisiana (United States) (both houses)

=== Legislatures elected by TRS in multi-member districts (block voting) ===
- Iran – modified; 25% required to win in first round (unicameral)
- Kiribati (unicameral)
- Mongolia – modified; 28% required to win in first round (unicameral)
- Vietnam (unicameral)

==== Sub-national legislatures ====
- French Polynesia (France) – two-round majority bonus system (unicameral)
- Italy – City councils (Majority bonus system)

=== Legislatures partially elected by TRS (mixed systems) ===
- Egypt (both houses; single-member and small multi-member districts, alongside party-list proportional representation in large multi-member districts)
- Lithuania (unicameral; single-member districts alongside party-list proportional representation nationwide)
- Tajikistan (unicameral; single-member districts alongside party-list proportional representation nationwide)
- United States – Used in Louisiana for legislative elections, in Georgia and Texas for special elections, and variants used in Alaska, California, and Washington.

=== Other examples of use ===
Two-round voting is used in French departmental elections. In Italy, it is used to elect mayors, but also to decide which party or coalition receives a majority bonus in city councils.

Historically it was used to elect the Reichstag in the German Empire between 1871 and 1918 and the Storting of Norway from 1905 to 1919, in New Zealand in the 1908 and 1911 elections, and in Israel to elect the Prime Minister in the 1996, 1999 and 2001 elections. El Salvador used a two-round system to elects its president until the 2024 presidential election; a constitutional reform in 2025 abolished the two-round system.
