= First-preference vote =

Individual voter's first choice

Example ranked voting ballot. John Citizen is the first preference on this ballot

A first-preference is a voter's most-preferred candidate. In certain ranked systems such as first preference plurality, ranked-choice voting (RCV), and the single transferable vote, first preferences for a candidate are considered most important and prioritized heavily. This incentivizes pandering to the political base or "core support" as a result of the center squeeze effect. Methods like Condorcet voting, rated voting, and the Borda count do not exhibit such effects. Methods like anti-plurality voting and Coombs' method have the opposite effect, being dominated by a voter's bottom rankings and so tending to elect the "least offensive" candidates.

First-preference votes are used by psephologists and the print and broadcast media to broadly describe the state of the parties at elections and the swing between elections. The term is much-used in Australian politics, where ranked voting has been universal at federal, state, and local levels since the 1920s.
