= Satisfaction approval voting =

Multiple-winner electoral system

Satisfaction approval voting (SAV), also known as equal and even cumulative voting, is an electoral system that is a form of multiwinner approval voting as well as a form of cumulative voting. In the academic literature, the rule was studied by Steven Brams and Marc Kilgour in 2010. In this system, voters may approve a number of candidates, and each approved candidate receives an equal fraction of the vote. For example, if a voter approves 4 candidates, then each candidate receives a 0.25 fractional vote. The election winners are those candidates that receive the highest fractional vote count.

This election system has been used for the election of at-large members to the city council in Peoria, Illinois, since 1991, with the amount of candidates approved being restricted to five, the number of seats up for election.

== Comparison to other approval variants ==
Satisfaction approval voting is a semi-proportional voting system, making it similar to single non-transferable vote (semi-proportional plurality) and cumulative voting. In other words, SAV is proportional so long as voters are perfectly strategic. Because of this semi-proportionality, SAV tends to be more proportional than block voting, but does not create fully representative results.

Satisfaction approval is similar to proportional approval voting (PAV), but splits votes differently. SAV splits each vote equally between all the approved candidates, while PAV splits each vote equally between all the winning candidates approved of by a voter. This makes PAV much less vulnerable to spoiler effects, and much simpler for voters--with SAV, voters must know exactly how many seats their party is entitled to, and only cast a number of votes equal to that number of seats. Moreover, they must coordinate on the exact set of candidates to vote for. Failing to execute this strategy properly can result in a "wipeout," as shown below.

== Example ==
In this election, there are 10 voters, and 5 candidates: John Quincy Adams, Henry Clay, Daniel Webster, William Crawford, and Andrew Jackson. The candidates compete for 2 seats. Adams, Webster, and Clay are all Whigs, while Jackson and Crawford each have their own coalition. The votes are:

- 6: Adams, Clay, Webster
- 3: Jackson
- 3: Crawford

Then, the total votes for each candidate are:

	Adams	Clay	Webster	Crawford	Jackson
Whig voters – total vote	6/3 = 2	6/3 = 2	6/3 = 2	0	0
Crawford voters – total vote	0	0	0	3	0
Jackson voters – total vote	0	0	0	0	3
overall vote	2	2	2	3	3

Note that despite winning a full majority of the vote, the Whigs receive no seats because of spoiler effects (while PAV satisfies independence of irrelevant alternatives, making it immune to such effects). Had one of the three candidates dropped out, the remaining two candidates would have received 4 votes and swept both seats.

== Party-approval voting ==
SAV can be used together with party approval voting, a special case of approval voting where each voter can approve of one or more parties, rather than directly approving candidates.
