= Papoon for President =

Compilation album by The Firesign Theatre
- Released: 2002
- Studio: Laugh.com
- Genre: Comedy
- Label: Columbia

The Firesign Theatre chronology
Radio Now Live (2001)	Papoon for President (2002)	All Things Firesign (2003)

Papoon for President is a comedy compilation album released in 2002 by the Firesign Theatre. George Papoon is a fictional US Presidential candidate invented by the group in 1972 for their filmed radio broadcast Martian Space Party, in which Papoon is nominated as the candidate of the "Natural Surrealist Party". The album is a compilation of material originally released in the film and the 1972 album Not Insane or Anything You Want To, plus material from 1976 and 1980. The first and last tracks contain interviews of Phillip Proctor and Peter Bergman done by Steve Marshall, broadcast on NPR both before and after the 1972 United States presidential election. These interviews were released on a promotional recording, A Firesign Chat with Papoon, by Columbia Records in November 1972.

== Track listing ==
All tracks are written by the Firesign Theatre.

No.	Title	Length
1.	"Not Insane! Papoon for President!" (Pre-election interview)	21:05
2.	"Papoon Nominated! President Off to Mars!"	4:35
3.	"Papoon & Tirebiter Get Big Berkeley Welcome!"	7:30
4.	"Thank You, Mr. President!"	8:40
5.	"Candidate Still Daffy! Reagan Blasts Rats"	6:52
6.	"One Organism, One Vote! The Aftermath!" (Post-election interview)	19:25
Total length:		68:07

== Track Information ==
This album includes two interviews of Proctor and Bergman conducted by Steve Marshal of KNX radio in Los Angeles during the 1972 presidential election.

George Papoon was The Firesign Theatre's fictional choice as a 1972 presidential candidate and the interviews conducted on side one represent Proctor and Bergman's arguments in favor of his election while side two represents their post-election explanation as to why Papoon did not win.

== Release history ==
This album was originally released as a white label "promo" LP only.

- LP - Columbia AS-41

Both tracks from this album were included on the group's 2004 CD Papoon For President - a compilation that is made up entirely of political routines by the group.

== Papoon in national politics ==
According to the Natural Surrealist Party (NSP), Papoon ran again for president in 1976 and won. The NSP said that his platform of "One organism, one vote!" gave him an overwhelming majority, but his win was not recognized because only human votes were counted in the 1976 election. Papoon had been particularly successfully with the single-celled votes because, where there was one vote for him, there were soon two, then four, then eight, then sixteen, then thirty two, then sixty four, etc. Papoon was so successful getting the single cell votes that he was not allowed to campaign at hospitals, because all the germs would come over to his side and make him sick. This isn't to say that all non-humans voted for Papoon. In the 1972 election, Nixon received a considerable number of votes from the rats, spiders and particularly, the wasps.

At the height of Papoon's 1976 campoon, there were over 90 "Cocoons for Papoon" across the United States, each a local affiliate of the NSP, each disseminating Firesign Theatre-inspired disinformation to local media. These included Lawrence Friends of the Martian Space Party (Lawrence, KS), Goonrot 666 (Topeka, KS), The Cowtown Cement Mixers and Bovid Cretins Laugh in Your Hat Chapter of Kansas City (Kansas City, MO), and Bulldada Time Control Labs (Glen Rose, TX), the latter of which evolved into the Church of the SubGenius.
