= Non-negative responsiveness =

Electoral pathology or paradox

Non-negative responsiveness or monotonicity is a property of a social choice rule, which says that increasing a candidate's rank on some ballots should not cause them to lose (or vice versa, that decreasing a candidate's rank should not cause them to win). This means rankings can be interpreted as ordering candidates from best to worst, with higher ranks corresponding to more support. Voting systems that violate non-negative responsiveness can be said to exhibit negative response, perversity, or an additional support paradox.

Perversity is often described by social choice theorists as an exceptionally severe kind of electoral pathology, as such rules can have "backwards" responses to voters' opinions, where popularity causes defeat while unpopularity leads to a win. Such rules treat the well-being of some voters as "less than worthless". These issues have led to constitutional prohibitions on such systems as violating the right to equal and direct suffrage. Negative response is often cited as an example of a perverse incentive, as rules with negative response can incentivize politicians to take extreme or unpopular positions in an attempt to shed excess votes.

Most ranked methods (including Borda and all common round-robin rules) satisfy non-negative responsiveness, as do all common rated voting methods (including approval, highest medians, and score). (Note: Apart from majority judgment, these systems satisfy an even stronger form of non-negative responsiveness: if there is a tie, any increase in a candidate's rating will break the tie in that candidate's favor.)

Negative responsiveness occurs in instant-runoff voting (IRV), the single transferable vote, and the two-round system. Some quota-based apportionment methods also violate the rule, as can the randomized Condorcet method in cases of cyclic ties.

The participation criterion is closely related, but different. While non-negative responsiveness deals with a voter changing their opinion (or vote), participation deals with situations where a voter choosing to cast a ballot at all has a backwards effect on the election.

== Definition ==
Miller defined two main classes of monotonicity failure in 2012, which have been repeated in later papers:

Upward monotonicity failure: Given the use of voting method V and a ballot profile B in which candidate X is the winner, X may nevertheless lose in ballot profile B' that differs from B only in that some voters rank X higher in B' than in B

Downward monotonicity failure: Given the use of voting method V and a ballot profile B in which candidate X is a loser, X may nevertheless win in ballot profile B' that differs from B only in that some voters rank X lower in B' than in B.

In simpler terms, an upward failure occurs when a winner loses from more support, and a downward failure occurs when a loser wins with less support.

The precise and formal meaning of "some voters rank X higher" can vary by context. In ranked-choice voting, this means that each voter whose preference differs in B' and B is such that in B', candidate X is higher-ranked than in B and all other comparisons between candidates are the same.

=== Views ===
Social choice theorists generally agree that negative responsiveness is an especially severe issue for a voting rule. Some have argued the mere possibility should be enough to disqualify runoff-based electoral methods, while others argue this is only true if it occurs in "easy" or "common" cases, generally meaning those without a Condorcet cycle.

Gallagher notes some political scientists are less concerned about negative response, arguing voters will not notice or understand it, making it appear random from their perspective and preventing exploitation by strategic voters. By contrast, other researchers have argued voters will predict negative response and respond by strategically down-ranking their preferred candidates, keeping it from affecting the results.

== By method ==
=== Runoff voting ===
Runoff-based voting systems such as ranked choice voting (RCV) are typically vulnerable to negative response. A notable example is the 2009 Burlington mayoral election, the United States' second instant-runoff election in the modern era, where Bob Kiss won the election as a result of 750 ballots ranking him in last place. Another example is given by the 2022 Alaska at-large special election.

An example with three parties (Top, Center, Bottom) is shown below. In this scenario, the Bottom party loses the first election. However, in the second election, it is elected after running an unsuccessful campaign and adopting a less popular platform, which pushes its supporters away; all of these pushed-away voters favor the Top party and none shift to supporting the Center party.

First election: Popular Bottom				Second election: Less popular Bottom		
	Round 1	Round 2			Round 1	Round 2
Top	~~25%~~		+6%	Top	31%	46%
Center	30%	55%	↗	Center	~~30%~~	
Bottom	45%	45%	-6%	Bottom	39%	54%

These two elections are an example of a center-squeeze, a class of elections where instant-runoff and plurality have difficulties electing the majority-preferred candidate. Here, the loss of support for Bottom policies makes the Top party more popular, allowing Bottom to defeat the Center party in the second round of the second election.

=== Proportional rules ===
Some proportional representation systems can exhibit negative responsiveness. These include the single transferable vote and some implementations of mixed-member proportional representation, generally as a result of poorly designed overhang rules. An example can be found in the 2005 German federal election.

== Frequency of violations ==
The frequency of negative response will depend on the electoral method, the candidates, and the distribution of outcomes.

=== Empirical analysis ===
In the US, a 2021 analysis of instant-runoff elections in California between 2008 and 2016, as well as the 2009 Burlington, Vermont mayoral election, found an upward monotonicity anomaly rate of 0.74% (1/135) in all elections, 2.71% (1/37) when limited to elections going to a second round of counting and 7.7% (1/13) of elections with three competitive candidates. A more comprehensive 2023 survey of 182 American IRV elections where no candidate was ranked first by a majority of voters found seven total examples of non-monotonicity (3.8%), broken down into 2.2% (4/182) examples of upward monotonicity, 1.6% (3/182) of downward montonicity and 0.5% (1/182) of no-show or truncation (one example was both an upward and downward monotonicity failure). Two of those elections are also noted as specific examples below.

==== Semi-empirical ====
Some empirical research do not have access to full ballot preference data, and thus make probabilistic estimates of transfer patterns. A 2013 survey of Irish elections using IRV and PR-STV found plausible non-monotonicity in 20 out of 1326 elections between 1922 and 2011.

Data from the five UK general elections between 1992 and 2010 showed 2642 three candidate elections in English constituencies. With second preferences imputed from survey data, 1.7% of all elections appeared vulnerable to monotonicity anomalies (1.4% upward, 0.3% downward), significantly lower than simulated datasets from the same paper. However, when limited to the 4.2% of elections considered three-way competitive, 40.2% appeared vulnerable (33% upward, 7.1% downward), and further increasing with closer competition, a result closer to the simulations.

A 2022 analysis out of the 10 French presidential elections (conducted under the two-round system) 2 had results where monotonicity violations were not mathematically possible, another 6 where violations were unlikely given the evidence, leaving 2 elections (2002 and 2007) where an upward monotonicity violation was probable and likely respectively.

=== Theoretical models ===
Results using the impartial culture model predict violations in about 15% of IRV elections with 3 candidates; however, the true probability may be much higher, especially when restricting observation to close elections.

A 2013 study using a two-dimensional spatial model of voting estimated at least 15% of IRV elections would be non-monotonic in the best-case scenario (with only three equally-competitive candidates). The researchers concluded that "three-way competitive races will exhibit unacceptably frequent monotonicity failures" and "In light of these results, those seeking to implement a fairer multi-candidate election system should be wary of adopting IRV."

=== Specific examples ===
==== 2022 in Alaska ====
Alaska's first-ever instant-runoff election resulted in a victory for Democrat Mary Peltola, but had many voters for Republican Sarah Palin instead ranked Peltola first, Peltola would have lost.

==== Burlington, Vermont ====
In Burlington's second IRV election, incumbent Bob Kiss was re-elected, despite losing in a head-to-head matchup with Democrat Andy Montroll (the Condorcet winner). However, if Kiss had gained more support from Wright voters, Kiss would have lost.

==== 2005 German election in Dresden ====
In the 2005 German federal election, CDU supporters in Dresden were instructed to vote for the FDP, a strategy that allowed the CDU to win an additional seat. This led the Federal Constitutional Court to rule that negative responsiveness violates the German constitution's guarantee of equal and direct suffrage.

== See also ==
- Participation criterion, a closely related concept
- Voting system
- Voting system criterion
- Monotone preferences in consumer theory
- Monotonicity (mechanism design)
- Maskin monotonicity
