= Cube rule =

Law regarding first-past-the-post elections

Expected fraction of seats won, s vs fraction of votes received, v (solid black) according to the cube rule, with a plot of the seat:vote ratio (dashed red)

The cube rule or cube law is an empirical observation regarding elections under the first-past-the-post system. The rule suggests that the party getting the most votes is over-represented (and conversely, the party getting the fewest votes is under-represented). It was first formulated in a report on British elections in 1909, then extended to elections in other countries. Both in theory and in practice, the cube rule is only applicable in a two-party system. In a multi-party democracy operating under the first-past-the-post system, the cube law invariably fails, often leading to capricious results.

Suppose we have two parties which receive A and B percent of the vote. According to the cube rule, the ratio of A seats-won to B seats-won should be proportional to A^{3}/B^{3}. So if A wins 66.7% and B wins 33.3%, the ratio of votes A/B = 66.7/33.3 ≈ 2, but the ratio of seats is 66.7^{3}:33.3^{3} ≈ 8:1. That works out to a ratio of seats of around 89:11. In a close election where the popular vote is A=52 and B=48, the seats break 56:44. In other words, the winner gets many extra seats. If there are three parties the ratio of seats will also be proportional to the cube of their votes.

The approximation can work well; it matched the 2002 U.S. House elections to within one seat. However, in elections for the United States House of Representatives in 1942, 1996, and 2012, the party that won a plurality of the votes actually won fewer seats in the House of Representatives.

In New Zealand, the rule predicted the distribution of seats between the two largest parties for most elections prior to election reform. From the 1940s onwards until 1993, after which the rule was irrelevant because of the introduction of mixed member proportional representation, many elections were predicted either exactly or within one seat, with most fluctuations from this in elections where there was a strong third-party showing.

== See also ==
- Duverger's law
