= Approval voting =

Single-winner electoral system

On an approval ballot, the voter can select any number of candidates.

Approval voting is a single-winner rated voting system where voters approve of any number of candidates named on a ballot, and the candidate with the most votes is victorious. The method is designed to eliminate vote-splitting while keeping election administration simple and easy to count, requiring only a single score for each candidate. Proponents of approval voting argue that the system more accurately represents candidates not belonging to a major party.

While approval voting is primarily considered in single-winner contexts, application to multiple-winner contexts is also possible. For example, if there are ten seats to be filled, the ten most-voted candidates would be selected. Winners can be selected in a single round of approval voting, but preliminary "narrowing" rounds can be included.

Approval voting has been used in both organizational and political elections to improve representativeness and voter satisfaction. As the number of candidates a voter may approve of is unlimited, approval voting is immune to overvoting.

== Effect on elections ==
Research by social choice theorists Steven Brams and Dudley R. Herschbach found that approval voting would increase voter participation, prevent minor-party candidates from being spoilers, and reduce negative campaigning. Brams' research concluded that approval can be expected to elect majority-preferred candidates in practical election scenarios, avoiding the center squeeze spoiler effect common to ranked-choice voting and primary elections.

A study of various evaluative voting methods (approval and score voting) during the 2012 French presidential election showed that "unifying" candidates tended to do better, and polarizing candidates did worse, as compared to under plurality voting.

== Variations ==
Some variants and generalizations of approval voting are:

- Multiwinner approval voting — voters elect multiple candidates, instead of just one.
- Fractional approval voting — the election outcome is a distribution - assigning a fraction to each candidate.
- Score voting (also called range voting) — is simply approval voting where voters can give a wider range of scores than 0 or 1 (e.g. 0-5 or 0–7).
- Combined approval voting — form of score voting with three levels that uses a scale of (-1, 0, +1) or (0, .5, 1).
- D21 – Janeček method — limited to two approval and one negative vote per voter.
- Unified primary — a nonpartisan primary that uses approval voting for the first round.

== Examples ==
=== Current electoral use ===
==== Latvia ====
The Latvian parliament uses a modified version of approval voting within open list proportional representation, in which voters can cast either positive (approval) votes, negative votes or neither for any number of candidates.

==== St. Louis, Missouri ====
In November 2020, St. Louis, Missouri, passed Proposition D with 70% voting to authorize a variant of approval (unified primary) for municipal offices. In 2021, the first mayoral election with approval voting saw Tishaura Jones and Cara Spencer move on to the general with 57% and 46% support. Lewis Reed and Andrew Jones were eliminated with 39% and 14% support, resulting in an average of 1.6 candidates supported by each voter in the 4 person race.

=== Use by organizations ===
Approval has been used in privately administered nomination contests by the Independent Party of Oregon in 2011, 2012, 2014, and 2016. Oregon is a fusion voting state, and the party has cross-nominated legislators and statewide officeholders using this method; its 2016 presidential preference primary did not identify a potential nominee due to no candidate earning more than 32% support. The party switched to using STAR voting in 2020.

It is also used in internal elections by the American Solidarity Party; the Green Parties of Texas and Ohio; the Libertarian National Committee; the Libertarian parties of Texas, Colorado, Arizona, and New York; Alliance 90/The Greens in Germany; and the Czech and German Pirate Party.

Approval has been adopted by several societies: the Society for Social Choice and Welfare (1992), Mathematical Association of America (1986), the American Mathematical Society, the Institute of Management Sciences (1987) (now the Institute for Operations Research and the Management Sciences), the American Statistical Association (1987), and the Institute of Electrical and Electronics Engineers (1987-2002).

Steven Brams' analysis of the 5-candidate 1987 Mathematical Association of America presidential election shows that 79% of voters cast a ballot for one candidate, 16% for 2 candidates, 5% for 3, and 1% for 4, with the winner earning the approval of 1,267 (32%) of 3,924 voters.

Approval voting was used for Dartmouth Alumni Association elections for seats on the College Board of Trustees until it was replaced with traditional runoff elections by an alumni vote of 82% to 18% in 2009. Dartmouth students used approval voting to elect their student body president from 2011-2016. The winner secured the support of 41% of voters (2011), 32% (2012), and under 40% (2013, 2014 and 2016). In the 2014 and 2016 elections, over 80 percent of voters selected only one candidate.

=== Historical ===
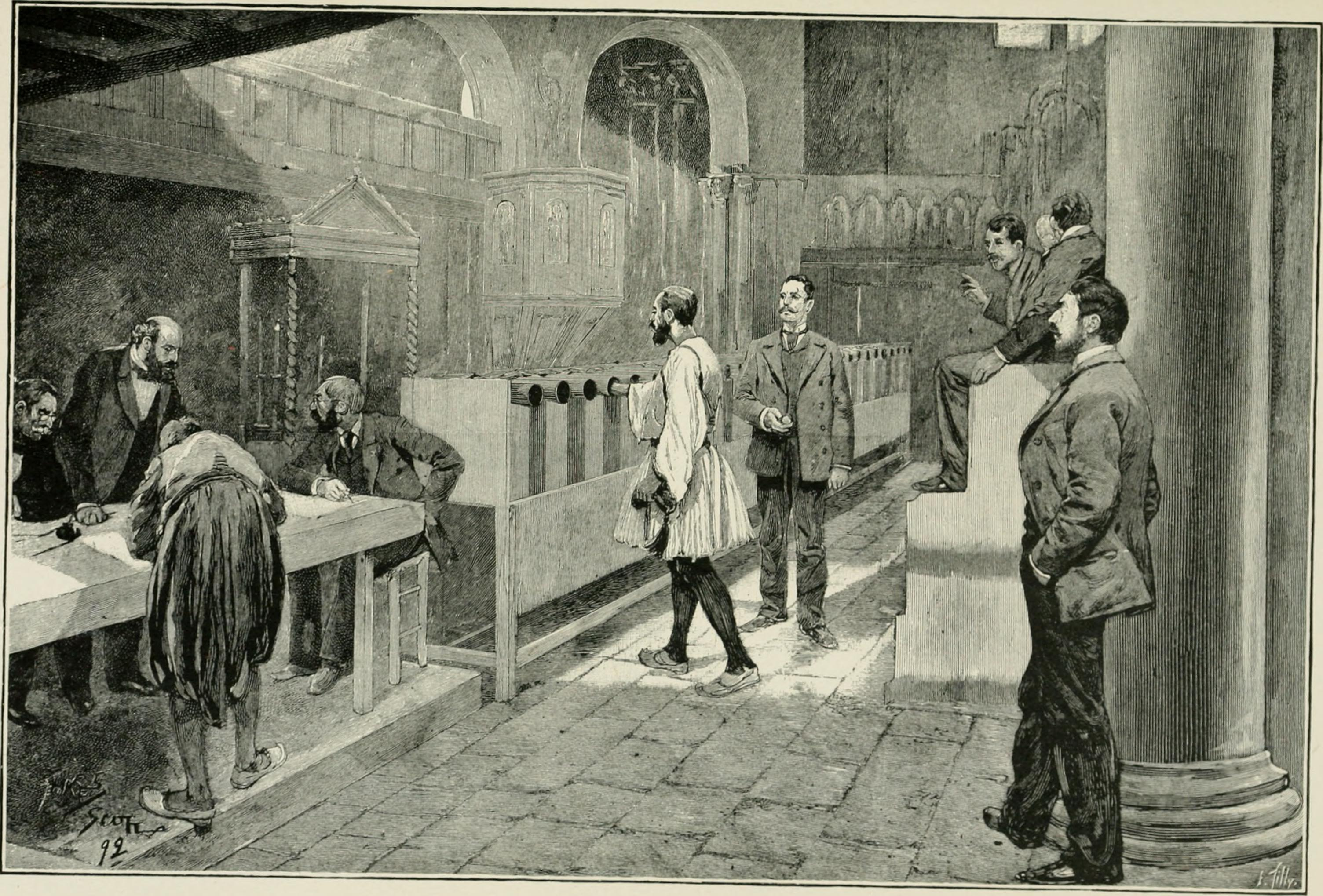
Rows of secret approval vote boxes from early 1900s Greece, where the voter drops a marble to the right or left of the box, through a tube, one for each candidate standing

Robert J. Weber coined the term "Approval Voting" in 1971. It was more fully published in 1978 by political scientist Steven Brams and mathematician Peter Fishburn.

Historically, several voting methods that incorporate aspects of approval have been used:

- Approval was used for papal conclaves between 1294 and 1621, with an average of about forty cardinals engaging in repeated rounds of voting until one candidate was listed on at least two-thirds of ballots.
- In the 13th through 18th centuries, the Republic of Venice elected the Doge of Venice using a multi-stage process that featured random selection and voting that allowed approval of multiple candidates.
- According to Steven J. Brams, approval was used for unspecified elections in 19th century England.
- The Secretary-General of the United Nations is elected in a multi-round straw poll process where, in each round, members of the Security Council may approve or disapprove of candidates, or decide to express no opinion. Disapproval by permanent members of the Security Council is similar to a veto. A candidate with no vetoes, at least nine votes, and more votes than any other candidate is considered to be likely to be supported by the Security Council in its formal recommendation vote.
- Approval was used in Greek legislative elections from 1864 to 1923, after which it was replaced with party-list proportional representation.
- Sequential proportional approval voting was used in Swedish elections in the early 20th century, prior to being replaced by party-list proportional representation.

The idea of approval was adopted by X. Hu and Lloyd Shapley in 2003 in studying authority distribution in organizations.

==== Fargo, North Dakota (2020-2024) ====
In 2018, Fargo, North Dakota, passed a local ballot initiative with 63% support adopting approval for the city's local elections, becoming the first United States city and jurisdiction to adopt approval. Previously in 2015, a Fargo city commissioner election had suffered from six-way vote-splitting, resulting in a candidate winning with 22% plurality of the vote.

The first election was held June 9, 2020, selecting two city commissioners, from seven candidates on the ballot. Fargo's second approval election took place in June 2022, for mayor and city commission. The incumbent mayor was re-elected from a field of 7 candidates, with an estimated 65% approval, with voters expressing 1.6 approvals per ballot, and the two commissioners were elected from a field of 15 candidates, with 3.1 approvals per ballot.

In 2023, the North Dakota legislature passed a bill which intended to ban approval voting. The bill was vetoed by governor Doug Burgum, citing the importance of "home rule" and allowing citizens control over their local government. The legislature attempted to overrule the veto but failed. In April 2025, Governor Kelly Armstrong signed a bill banning ranked-choice voting and approval voting in the state, ending the practice in Fargo.

== Strategic voting ==
=== Overview ===
Approval voting allows voters to select all the candidates whom they consider to be reasonable choices.

Strategic approval differs from ranked voting (aka preferential voting) methods where voters are generally forced to reverse the preference order of two options, which if done on a larger scale can cause an unpopular candidate to win. Strategic approval, with more than two options, involves the voter changing their approval threshold. The voter decides which options to give the same rating, even if they were to have a preference order between them. This leaves a tactical concern any voter has for approving their second-favorite candidate, in the case that there are three or more candidates. Approving their second-favorite means the voter harms their favorite candidate's chance to win. Not approving their second-favorite means the voter helps the candidate they least desire to beat their second-favorite and perhaps win.

Approval technically allows for but is strategically immune to push-over and burying.

Bullet voting occurs when a voter approves only candidate "a" instead of both "a" and "b" for the reason that voting for "b" can cause "a" to lose. The voter would be satisfied with either "a" or "b" but has a moderate preference for "a". Were "b" to win, this hypothetical voter would still be satisfied. If supporters of both "a" and "b" do this, it could cause candidate "c" to win. This creates the "chicken dilemma", as supporters of "a" and "b" are playing chicken as to which will stop strategic voting first, before both of these candidates lose.

Compromising occurs when a voter approves an additional candidate who is otherwise considered unacceptable to the voter to prevent an even worse alternative from winning.

=== Sincere voting ===
Approval experts describe sincere votes as those "... that directly reflect the true preferences of a voter, i.e., that do not report preferences 'falsely.'" They also give a specific definition of a sincere approval vote in terms of the voter's ordinal preferences as being any vote that, if it votes for one candidate, it also votes for any more preferred candidate. This definition allows a sincere vote to treat strictly preferred candidates the same, ensuring that every voter has at least one sincere vote. The definition also allows a sincere vote to treat equally preferred candidates differently. When there are two or more candidates, every voter has at least three sincere approval votes to choose from. Two of those sincere approval votes do not distinguish between any of the candidates: vote for none of the candidates and vote for all of the candidates. When there are three or more candidates, every voter has more than one sincere approval vote that distinguishes between the candidates.

==== Example ====
Based on the definition above, if there are four candidates, A, B, C, and D, and a voter has a strict preference order, preferring A to B to C to D, then the following are the voter's possible sincere approval votes:

- vote for A, B, C, and D
- vote for A, B, and C
- vote for A and B
- vote for A
- vote for no candidates

The decision between the above ballots is equivalent to deciding an arbitrary "approval cutoff." All candidates preferred to the cutoff are approved, all candidates less preferred are not approved, and any candidates equal to the cutoff may be approved or not arbitrarily.

=== Sincere strategy with ordinal preferences ===
A sincere voter with multiple options for voting sincerely still has to choose which sincere vote to use. Voting strategy is a way to make that choice, in which case strategic approval includes sincere voting, rather than being an alternative to it. This differs from other voting systems that typically have a unique sincere vote for a voter.

When there are three or more candidates, the winner of an approval election can change, depending on which sincere votes are used. In some cases, approval can sincerely elect any one of the candidates, including a Condorcet winner and a Condorcet loser, without the voter preferences changing. To the extent that electing a Condorcet winner and not electing a Condorcet loser is considered desirable outcomes for a voting system, approval can be considered vulnerable to sincere, strategic voting. In one sense, conditions where this can happen are robust and are not isolated cases. On the other hand, the variety of possible outcomes has also been portrayed as a virtue of approval, representing the flexibility and responsiveness of approval, not just to voter ordinal preferences, but cardinal utilities as well.

==== Dichotomous preferences ====
Approval avoids the issue of multiple sincere votes in special cases when voters have dichotomous preferences. For a voter with dichotomous preferences, approval is strategyproof. When all voters have dichotomous preferences and vote the sincere, strategy-proof vote, approval is guaranteed to elect a Condorcet winner. However, having dichotomous preferences when there are three or more candidates is not typical. It is an unlikely situation for all voters to have dichotomous preferences when there are more than a few voters.

Having dichotomous preferences means that a voter has bi-level preferences for the candidates. All of the candidates are divided into two groups such that the voter is indifferent between any two candidates in the same group and any candidate in the top-level group is preferred to any candidate in the bottom-level group. A voter that has strict preferences between three candidates—prefers A to B and B to C—does not have dichotomous preferences.

Being strategy-proof for a voter means that there is a unique way for the voter to vote that is a strategically best way to vote, regardless of how others vote. In approval, the strategy-proof vote, if it exists, is a sincere vote.

==== Approval threshold ====
Another way to deal with multiple sincere votes is to augment the ordinal preference model with an approval or acceptance threshold. An approval threshold divides all of the candidates into two sets, those the voter approves of and those the voter does not approve of. A voter can approve of more than one candidate and still prefer one approved candidate to another approved candidate. Acceptance thresholds are similar. With such a threshold, a voter simply votes for every candidate that meets or exceeds the threshold.

With threshold voting, it is still possible to not elect the Condorcet winner and instead elect the Condorcet loser when they both exist. However, according to Steven Brams, this represents a strength rather than a weakness of approval. Without providing specifics, he argues that the pragmatic judgments of voters about which candidates are acceptable should take precedence over the Condorcet criterion and other social choice criteria.

=== Strategy with cardinal utilities ===
Voting strategy under approval is guided by two competing features of approval. On the one hand, approval fails the later-no-harm criterion, so voting for a candidate can cause that candidate to win instead of a candidate more preferred by that voter. On the other hand, approval satisfies the monotonicity criterion, so not voting for a candidate can never help that candidate win, but can cause that candidate to lose to a less preferred candidate. Either way, the voter can risk getting a less preferred election winner. A voter can balance the risk-benefit trade-offs by considering the voter's cardinal utilities, particularly via the von Neumann–Morgenstern utility theorem, and the probabilities of how others vote.

A rational voter model described by Myerson and Weber specifies an approval strategy that votes for those candidates that have a positive prospective rating. This strategy is optimal in the sense that it maximizes the voter's expected utility, subject to the constraints of the model and provided the number of other voters is sufficiently large.

An optimal approval vote always votes for the most preferred candidate and not for the least preferred candidate, which is a dominant strategy. An optimal vote can require supporting one candidate and not voting for a more preferred candidate if there 4 candidates or more, e.g. the third and fourth choices are correlated to gain or lose decisive votes together; however, such situations are inherently unstable, suggesting such strategy should be rare.

Other strategies are also available and coincide with the optimal strategy in special situations. For example:

- Vote for the candidates that have above average utility. This strategy coincides with the optimal strategy if the voter thinks that all pairwise ties are equally likely.
- Vote for any candidate that is more preferred than the expected winner and also vote for the expected winner if the expected winner is more preferred than the expected runner-up. This strategy coincides with the optimal strategy if there are three or fewer candidates or if the pivot probability for a tie between the expected winner and expected runner-up is sufficiently large compared to the other pivot probabilities. This strategy, if used by all voters, implies at equilibrium the election of the Condorcet winner whenever it exists.
- Vote for the most preferred candidate only. This strategy coincides with the optimal strategy when the best candidate is either much better than all others (i.e. is the only one with a positive expected value).
- If all voters are rational and cast a strategically optimal vote based on a common knowledge of how all other voters vote except for small-probability, statistically independent errors, then the winner will be the Condorcet winner, if one exists.

== Compliance with voting system criteria ==
Most of the mathematical criteria by which voting systems are compared were formulated for voters with ordinal preferences. In this case, approval voting requires voters to make an additional decision of where to put their approval cutoff (see examples above). Depending on how this decision is made, approval satisfies different sets of criteria.

There is no ultimate authority on which criteria should be considered, but the following are criteria that many voting theorists accept and consider desirable:

Voting model:	Majority	Monotone and Participation	Condorcet and Smith	IIA	Clone independence	Reversal symmetry	Sincere favorite	Strategyproof
Zero information	No	Yes	No	No	No	Yes	Yes	No
Leader rule	Yes	Yes	Yes	No			Yes	No
Trembling ballots	Yes	Yes	Yes	No			Yes	No
Binary preferences (Note: Assuming voters have only two categories of preference ("approve" and "disapprove"). Voters are indifferent between any two candidates they approve, and between any two they disapprove. As a result, a voter's approval of a candidate does not depend on what the other alternatives are.)	Yes	Yes	Yes	Yes	Yes	Yes	Yes	Yes

== See also ==
- Burr dilemma
