= Robin Farquharson =

British social scientist (1930–1973)

- Farquharson in 1970
- Born: Reginald Robin Farquharson; 3 October 1930; Pretoria, Union of South Africa
- Died: 1 April 1973 (aged 42); Somers Town, London, England
- Citizenship: British

Academic background
- Education: Rhodes University College; University of Oxford
- Thesis: An approach to a pure theory of voting procedure (1958)
- Doctoral advisor: Norman Chester

Reginald Robin Farquharson (3 October 1930 – 1 April 1973) was an academic whose interest in mathematics and politics led him to work on game theory and social choice theory. He wrote an influential analysis of voting systems in his doctoral thesis, later published as Theory of Voting, and conjectured the Gibbard–Satterthwaite theorem together with the philosopher and logician Michael Dummett.

Farquharson diagnosed himself as suffering from bipolar disorder (manic depression), and episodes of mania made it difficult for him to obtain a permanent university position and also resulted in him losing commercial employment. In later years, he dropped out of mainstream society, and became a prominent counter-cultural figure in late-1960s London. Farquharson wrote an account of his unconventional life in his 1968 book, Drop Out!, in which he described a week of being homeless in London. In 1973 he died from burns associated with an arson, for which two persons were convicted of unlawful killing.

== Education ==
Robin Farquharson was educated at Michaelhouse, Natal, South Africa, 1944–46. He earned a B.A. in South Africa from Rhodes University College, Grahamstown (1947–50). Subsequently studying at Brasenose and Nuffield Colleges, University of Oxford (1950–53), he obtained a second-class B.A. honours PPE degree. For his B.A. 1953–54 (?), his studies at this time were overseen by David Butler of Nuffield College, Oxford University. His D.Phil. was awarded in June 1958 from Nuffield College for his thesis entitled "An Approach to a Pure Theory of Voting Procedures". He was given a Research Fellowship at Churchill College, Cambridge in 1964. He also studied at the Sorbonne in Paris.

While an undergraduate at Oxford, Farquharson was a contemporary of John Searle, Rupert Murdoch, and Sir Michael Dummett. In the preface to Probability and Scientific Inference (1957) George Spencer Brown thanked Farquharson for his help in discussing and clarifying some of the ideas in the book, before publishing his paper.

== Research on voting ==
Farquharson wrote a monograph on the analysis of voting procedures and several papers, including a notable paper with Michael Dummett that conjectured the Gibbard–Satterthwaite theorem.

=== Strategic voting ===
Farquharson published influential articles on the theory of voting: in particular, in an article with Michael Dummett, he conjectured that deterministic voting rules with more than three issues faced endemic strategic voting. The Dummett–Farquharson conjecture was proved by Allan Gibbard, a philosopher and former student of Kenneth J. Arrow and John Rawls, and by Mark Satterthwaite, an economist.

After the establishment of the Farquarson-Dummett conjecture by Gibbard and Sattherthwaite, Michael Dummett contributed three proofs of the Gibbard–Satterthwaite theorem in his monograph on voting.

=== Theory of Voting ===
In the field of political game theory, Farquharson's main contribution was his exposition of the Condorcet paradox regarding the sincerity of voters. The problem was initially raised by Pliny the Younger and then picked up again in the political pamphlets of Reverend Charles Lutwidge Dodgson (Lewis Carroll), who was a significant influence on Farquharson.

Theory of Voting was originally Farquharson's doctoral thesis but was deemed to be of such a high quality it was later published as a book in its own right. Although written in 1958, when his doctorate was awarded, it was eventually published in 1969, by Yale University Press. The main reason given for the delay in publication is that Farquharson insisted that the logical choice diagrams be printed in colour, which they eventually were, in black, white and red.

The book won the Monograph Prize in the field of Social Sciences, awarded by the American Academy of Arts and Sciences.

== Mental illness ==
At some point, Farquharson came to diagnose himself as suffering from several mental illnesses including bipolar disorder (manic depression) and cyclothymia. His condition caused him to be absent frequently from his university studies, starting November 1955 to March 1957. He was further absent from his studies after the death of his father.

=== Call to the Warden of All Souls College ===
As Michael Dummett recalls, in 1955 Farquharson sat the Fellowship examination for All Souls College. On the evening before an election meeting was held to discuss Farquharson's admission as a Fellow, the Warden of the college received a telephone call, which started with the words: "Do you have a pen and paper?" Farquharson tried to dictate what Dummett describes (he was not present himself) as a "lengthy statement in quasi-technical language, expounding a discovery which would have solve [sic] many problems in mathematics, mathematical logic, physics, economics and the theory of voting."

Dummett clarifies the accuracy of his recollection: "I know very well what it was like: though I was away for the year in California, Farquharson also telephoned me there in just the same manner."

Farquharson was undergoing an attack of his mental illness, which it is believed caused him to contact the College Warden.

Dummett believes that Farquharson was far and above the best candidate for the election to the college; however, the Warden chose to mention Farquharson's telephone call to the Fellows, and Dummett believes the Warden "...inferred that Farquharson had gone mad", which no doubt led to his not being elected to the senior position of Fellow at All Souls College.

Farquharson briefly describes the incident in Drop Out!: "...when as a candidate for a Fellowship of All Souls, I had destroyed my chances by a telephone call to the Warden, calling him from his high table to tell him that I had a message from God for him."

=== Mental health activism ===
After fully dropping out, Farquharson did some work supporting the mental health patient reform groups of the late 1960s, working with organisations such as the Mental Patients' Union. He wrote, campaigned and argued with other members of the group for mental patients to have a greater say in their own treatment. He also helped to secure squatted sites and rent houses for groups to hold meetings and simply for a place to live.

Farquharson was a mental health activist working both with Tommie Ritchie in the Scottish Union of Mental Patients (SUMP) during 1972 and then the Mental Patients Union in 1973, shortly before his death. He was the first member of SUMP from outside Hartwood Hospital.

== Later life and work ==
After being rejected for the prospective Fellowship at All Souls College, Oxford, Farquharson worked for a brief time as an academic at Cambridge University. After losing this job, he worked in various other administrative positions, including as a manager for a call centre. He also contributed to the counter-cultural Bitman magazine, which published a special obituary edition as a tribute to him after his death in 1973.

His friend Guy Legge, who knew him from his time in Horton Hospital, thought Robin was an alcoholic and blames his wild mood swings on his dependency.

== Autobiographical Drop Out! ==
Dropping out commonly refers to a person who has left an educational institution without completing the course. This does not apply in the same way to Robin Farquharson, who held several degrees. The title of his book more accurately refers to his dropping out from the comfort of academic life into the uncertainty of London street-life.

The book begins with a quote from a poem by Matthew Arnold:

We cannot kindle when we will
The fire which in the heart resides,
The spirit bloweth and is still,
In mystery our soul abides:
But tasks in hours of insight willed
Can be through hours of gloom fulfilled.

– Matthew Arnold, "Morality".

Essentially, the book is an account of Farquharson finding himself homeless and with little money and many debts, both through circumstance and his own actions. He initiated an experiment commencing on Monday 20 November 1967: he set out to forsake money (several times and with varying success) as a kind of restrictive social evil. This leaves him with very little option but to sleep rough and stay with friends or acquaintances now and again. The book includes a chapter on the free help offered by Rhaune Laslett and the Notting Hill Neighbourhood Service.

Critics argue that the book presents an artificial view of poverty because the author's experience is mitigated by personal privilege. The narrative shows that the protagonist frequently avoids severe hardship through fortunate events, the kindness of strangers, and assistance from old friends. Consequently, commentators note that the work fails to reflect genuine destitution, as the author maintains a financial and social safety net that allows him to exit difficult economic circumstances at will.

The book is similar in style and content to other works of psycho-geography written by the situationists. (Indeed, Farquharson went on to form the Situationist Housing Association to provide accommodation for People Not Psychiatry). Many sections of the book simply list the areas of London Farquharson has walked through, including the names of streets and buildings he passes, interspersed with events and acquaintances he makes along the way.

The flux of his mental state and the variety of situations he encounters make the book an interesting and vibrant account of London in the late 1960s. He copies information on a notice board, and rates graffiti in a public toilet for spelling, grammar and general interest.

== Political activity ==
In 1965 Farquharson's South African passport was revoked as a result of his part in the lobbying, on behalf of SANROC, for South Africa's exclusion from the Olympic Games held in Tokyo, Japan, in 1964. He was rumoured to have been a member of the political White Panther movement.

He became a British subject in 1968.

He is also said to have helped tear down the walls at the Isle of Wight Festival 1970.

== The squat years ==
Towards the end of his life, Farquharson spent much of his time in "open university" squat communities, a period during which he met artists and thinkers, including the poet Aidan Andrew Dun and the psychiatrist R. D. Laing.

== Death ==
Farquharson died as the result of a fire at a house in Platt Street, Somers Town, London, in April 1973, down the road from St Pancras Old Church. After being exposed to the fire, Farquharson suffered third degree burns. He was taken to the Hospital for Tropical Diseases near to St Pancras churchyard, where he died from his burns. Two workers also living in the house were tried for his death and found guilty of "unlawful killing".

== In popular culture ==
- Iain Sinclair, Lights Out for the Territory

== Bibliography ==
- Farquharson, Robin (February 1956). "Straightforwardness in voting procedures". Oxford Economic Papers. New Series. 8 (1): 80–89. doi:10.1093/oxfordjournals.oep.a042255. JSTOR 2662065.
- Michael Dummett and Robin Farquharson (January 1961). "Stability in Voting". Econometrica. 29 (1): 33–43. doi:10.2307/1907685. JSTOR 1907685.
- Dummett, Michael (2005). "The work and life of Robin Farquharson". Social Choice and Welfare. 25 (2): 475–483. doi:10.1007/s00355-005-0014-x. S2CID 27639067.
- Rudolf Farra and Maurice Salles (October 2006). "An Interview with Michael Dummett: From analytical philosophy to voting analysis and beyond". Social Choice and Welfare. 27 (2): 347–364. doi:10.1007/s00355-006-0128-9. S2CID 46164353.
