= Carlo Penco =

Italian philosopher (born 1948)

- Born: August 1948 (age 78); Genoa

Philosophical work
- Era: Contemporary philosophy
- Region: Western philosophy
- School: Analytic
- Main interests: Philosophy of language Philosophy of logic Philosophy of mathematics Ontology; Cognitive science Artificial Intelligence

Carlo Penco (born August 1948) is an Italian analytic philosopher and full professor in philosophy of language at the University of Genoa in Italy.

== Biography ==
Born to Emilio Penco (engineer) and Margherita Castello (high school Italian teacher), Penco received his Ph.D. in Philosophy Summa cum Laude at the University of Genoa in 1972 with a specialization in the philosophy of science (at the time in Italy there were no PhD; he became a member of the PhD program later as a teacher). He studied with Evandro Agazzi in Genoa, with Michael Dummett in Oxford, and later with Robert Brandom and John McDowell at the University of Pittsburgh (he later organized a congress on Brandom's analytic pragmatism). He has received various academic awards and fellowships including: CNR Fellow (1976), NATO Fellow at Oxford University (1979), Fellow of the Pittsburgh Center for Philosophy of Science (1997–1998) and Fellow of the Institute of Philosophy (London) (2013–2014). He has been President of the Italian Society for the Analytic Philosophy (2002–2004), and member of Steering Committee of the Italian Society for Logic and the Philosophy of Sciences and the European Society for Analytic Philosophy. Together with Joao Branquino and Josep Corbi, he began a series of "Latin Meeting in Analytic Philosophy", in order to foster the exchange of ideas among Analytic Philosophers in the southern countries in Europe, with connection with Latin America. He has been teaching in South of Italy (University of Lecce) between 1988 and 1991; then he went to the University of Genoa, where he taught as full professor in Philosophy of Language until 2017. President of the Master in Philosophy during the period 2004–2010, he became Head of the Doctoral School in Human Science. He has been working in the Editorial or Scientific Committees for various journals, such as Epistemologia, An International Journal for Logic and Philosophy of Science, Networks, A journal for the philosophy of Artificial Intelligence and the Cognitive Sciences, European Journal of Analytic Philosophy, Theoria (A Swedish Journal for Philosophy). His early research interests has been mainly on the philosophy of the later Wittgenstein and the philosophy of Frege. He began to work on the problem of context for the Meetings "Modeling and Using Contexts" since 1999. His latest interests are more strictly linked to different topics in the Philosophy of Language and Pragmatics, mainly on the problem of the boundaries between semantics and pragmatics and the relation between indexicals and demonstrations. He is a founder of the Philvideos Project.

== Published works ==
Books (author)

- "The Dask Side of Speech", Vernon Press (2024)
- (with Filippo Domaneschi) "Come non detto: usi e abusi dei sottintesi", Laterza, Roma (2016)
- "Frege", Carocci, Roma, 2010
- Introduzione alla filosofia del linguaggio Laterza, Roma-Bari 2004 (3 ed. 2005)
- Vie della Scrittura, Milano, Angeli, 1994 (2 ed. 2002)
- Matematica e gioco linguistico, Wittgenstein e la filosofia della matematica del '900. Firenze, Le Monnier, 1981

Books (editor)

- (with Eva Picardi) "Frege: Logica, Pensiero e linguaggio. I fondamenti dell'aritmetica e altri scritti", Roma, Laterza, 2019.
- (with P. Brezillon and R. Turner, eds) "Modeling and Using Context", LNAI 10257, 2017.
- (with F. Domaneschi): "What is Said and What is Not (on semantics/pragmatics interface)", Stanford, CSLI, 2013.
- (with A. Bottani) "Significato e teorie del linguaggio", 2n edition with added bibliography, Milano, Angeli, 2013-
- "Explaining the Mental" (With M. Beaney and M. Vignolo), Cambridge Scholar Publishing, 2007.
- La svolta contestuale (a reading of original papers in philosophy of language and artificial intelligence by V. Akman, M. Benerecetti, M. Benzi, P. Bouquet, M. Frixione, C. Ghidini, F. Giunchiglia, F. Guala, M. Motterlni, J. Perry, E. Picardi, S. Predelli, M. Sbisà, A. Varzi, N. Vassallo) McGraw Hill, 2002
- (with Eva Picardi): Gottlob Frege, Senso, funzione e concetto (philosophical papers 1891–1897) Laterza, Bari, 2001.
- Filosofia analitica - Reading of Frege, Russell, Wittgenstein, Quine, Austin, Grice, Searle, Putnam - La Nuova Italia, Firenze, 2001.
- (with G. Sarbia) Alle radici della filosofia analitica (Acts of the first Italian conference of the Italiana Society of Analytic Philosophy - with edition in print and in hypertext), Erga, Genova, 1996
- (with C. Dalla Pozza) Linguaggi e Macchine - Epistemologia (special issues on logic and artificial intelligence) - 1993
- (with A. Bottani) Significato e teorie del linguaggio (Reading including Brandom, Davidson, Dummett, Kaplan, Kripke, Putnam, Barwise, Hall Partee...) Milano, Angeli, 1991.
- Italian edition of E. Tugendhat Vorlesungen über die Sprachanalytische Philosophie:Introduzione alla filosofia analitica, Marietti, Genova, 1989
- (with D. Marconi and M. Andronico), Capire Wittgenstein Readings (including Von Wright, Dummett, Stroud, Black, Kenny, Robinson, ....) Genova, Marietti, 1988
- Italian edition (with M. Sbisà) of J.L.Austin How to do things with words: Come fare cose con le parole, Genova, Marietti. 1987
- Italian edition of M. Dummett, Philosophy of language, (with translation): Filosofia del linguaggio. Saggio su Frege, Genova, Marietti, 1983

Selected papers

- "Wittgenstein, Context and AI. And Engineer among philosophers", in The Journal for the Philosophy of Language, Mind and Art, May 2024.
- "Einstein and Wittgenstein’s mental experiments:on the similarity between Wittgenstein and relativity theory", the Journal of Physics: Conference Series (St Cross College Oxford), 2024.
- (with Maria Silvia Vaccarezza) "Wittgenstein's Non-non-cognitivism", in Roberta Dreon, Matteo Favaretti Camposampiero, Gian Luigi Paltrinieri e Elena Valeri (eds.) Senza Trampoli. Saggi filosofici per Luigi Perissinotto. Mimesis, 2024.
- (with Nevia Dolcini)"Gottlob Frege and Gongsun Long in Dialogue". Asian Studies, 11 (1):267-295, 2023. DOI: 10.4312/as.2023.11.1.267-295
- (with Diana Mazzarella and Antonio Negro ) "Contexts: Everything You Always Wanted to Know about Context (But Were Afraid to Ask)", Argumenta, 8 (9-33), 2022. DOI 10.14275/2465-2334/202215.maz
- "Indexical and Essential Demonstrations", Semiotica 240 (261–284), 2021. https://doi.org/10.1515/sem-2021-0008
- (with Massimiliano Vignolo) "Meaning and Context Sensitivity". Internet Encyclopedia of Philosophy.
- "Wittgenstein's Thought Experiments and Relativity Theory", in N. Da Costa, S. Wuppuluri (eds) Looking at Science from the viewpoint of Wittgenstein's philosophy, Springer: 341–362, 2020.
- (with Margherita Benzi) "Nonlinguistic aspects of linguistic contexts" in Lecture Notes in Artificial Intelligence, 11939 (1–13), 2019. https://doi.org/10.1007/978-3-030-34974-5_1
- (with Massimiliano Vignolo) "Some reflexions on Conventions" in Croatian Journal of Philosophy, 19 (57): 375–402, 2019.
- (with M. Benzi) "Defeasible Arguments and Context Dependence" in Paradigmi, 36/3: 561–577, 2018.doi: 10.30460/91908
- "Refusing to Endorse. A Must Explanation for Pejoratives" in A. Coliva et al. (editors) Eva Picardi on Language, Analysis and History, Springer, 2018.
- "Context in Philosophy: Pragmatic Competence as Filter" In Modeling and Using Contexts, ISTE Open Science 2018/1: 1–121, 2018.
- (With Guido Borghi) "Kaplan's Sloppy Thinker and the Demonstrative Orginis of Indexicals", Quaderni di Semantica, 3-4 (117–137),2017-18.
- (with M. Vignolo) "Varieties on Contexts" in CEUR Proceedings 1845 (1–5), 2017.
- "Donnellan's Misdescriptions and Loose Talk", in Maria Ponte & Kepa Korta editors, Reference and Representation in Language and Thought, Oxford: Oxford U.P. 2017.
- (with F. Domaneschi, E.Carrea, A.Greco) "Selecting presuppositions in conditional clauses" in G. Airenti, M. Cruciani, A.Plebe (eds); Context in Communication. A cognitive view, Lausanne: Frontiers Media.2017.
- (with A. Negro) "Kenny's wrong formula", in Philosophical Investigations, 40, 2016.
- (with F. Domaneschi, E.Carrea, A.Greco) "Selecting presuppositions in conditional clauses" in Frontiers in Psychology, 10, 2016.
- "Context Dependence, MOPs, WHIMs and Procedures: Recanati and Kaplan on Cognitive Aspects in semantics", in Lecture Notes on Artificial Intelligence 9405 (410–422), 2015.
- "Frege's Theory of Demonstratives as a Model for Indexical Thought" in Dieter Shott (Hrsg.) Frege: Freund(e) un Feind(e), Berlin: Logos (201–216), 2015.
- (with F. Domaneschi, E. Carrea, A. Greco) "The cognitive Load of presupposition triggers: Mandatory and optional repairs in presupposition failure", in Language, Cognition and Neuroscience Volume 29, Issue 1, 2014.
- (with F. Domaneschi, E. Carrea, A. Greco) "An experimental Approach to Attitudes towards Propositions" in Pragmatics and Cognition, 2014.
- "What Happened to the Sense of a Concept Word?" in ProtoSociology, 30 (6-28), 2013.
- "Sense and Linguistic meaning: a solution to the Kripke-Burge Conflict", in Paradigmi, 2013/III (75–89). 2014.
- "Dummett and the game of Tarot", in Teorema, XXXII/1 (Issue on Dummett's Legacy, edited by Karen Green), 2014.
- "Indexicals as demonstratives: on the debate between Kripke and Künne" in Grazer Philosophische Studien, 88, 2014
- (with Santoro) "New Perspectives on Analytic Pragmatism", Philosophia, 40 (1–11), 2013.
- "Essentially Incomplete Descriptions", European Journal for Analytic Philosophy, 2011
- "Assertion and Inference" in Towards an Analytic Pragmatism, CEUR Workshop, 2009: http://ceur-ws.org/Vol-444
- "The influence of Einstein on Wittgenstein's Philosophy", in Philosophical Investigations 2010
- "Il senso degli enunciati. La nefasta influenza del Tractatus sulla filosofia della logica", in L. Perissinotto (a cura di) /Un filosofo senza trampoli. Saggi su Ludwig Wittgenstein, Mimesis, 2010.
- "Rational procedures: A Neo-Fregean Perspective on Thought and Judgement" in Yearbook of Philosophical Hermeneutics: The dialogue, Münster, 2009 (137–153)
- "Keeping track of individuals: Brandom's Analysis of Kripke's puzzle and the content of belief". In: S. Pirmin, Stekeler, Weithofer (eds) The Pragmatics of Making It Explicit, Benjamins, Amsterdam ( 163–185).
- "Wittgenstein, olismo ed esperimenti mentali:l'influenza di Einstein" in Paradigmi, 2, 2008
- "Inferenza e contesto: quali limiti alla libertà di parola?", in Cassazione penale, XLVIII, 2008 (3060–3075).
- "Idiolect and Context"; in R.E.Auxier and L.E. Hahn (eds.) The Philosophy of Michael Dummett - Library of Living Philosophers, vol. XXXI, 2007(567–590).
- "Competenza pragmatica come filtro", in M.Andronico, A. Paternoster, A. Voltolini, Il significato eluso. Saggi in onore di Diego Marconi, Rivista di Estetica, n. 34 (1/2007), anno XLVII
- "Context and Contract" in Perspectives on Contexts, edited by Paolo Bouquet, Luciano Serafini, and Rich Thomason. CSLI, Stanford, 2006.
- Enciclopedia Filosofica di Gallarate, 2006, Voci: E. Anscombe, Apriori-Aposteriori, D. Armstrong, R. Brandom, Deflazionismo, M. Dummett, Estensionalita', G. Evans, Filosofia Postanalitica, G. Frege, P. Geach, Gioco Linguistico, Intensione/Estensione, F. Kambartel, D. Kaplan, S. Kripke, L. Linsky, J. Mcdowell, Opacita' Referenziale, J. Perry, A. Prior, E. Tugendhat, C. Wright.
- "Converging towards What? on semantic and pragmatic competence" in P. Bouquet, L. Serafini, Context representation and reasoning 2005, proceedings of the first international workshop, CEUR-WS, vol.136, 2005 <http://sunsite.informatik.rwth-aachen.de/Publications/CEUR-WS/Vol-136/>
- "Keeping Track of Individuals: Brandom's Analysis of Kripke's Puzzle and the Content of Belief", in Pragmatics and Cognition, 13:1 (2005), 177–201
- "Anatra all'arancia: il tema del contesto nella filosofia analitica", Teoria 2005 (1) pp. 3–21.
- "Wittgenstein, Locality and Rules" in E.Picardi, A.Coliva, Wittgenstein Today, Il Poligrafo, Padova, 2004, pp. 249–274.
- "Frege, sense and limited rationality" Modern Logic Vol.9, 2001-2003 (Issue 29) pp. 53–65
- "Frege: Two thesis, two senses", in History and Philosophy of Logic 2003, vol. 24, n.2 (pp. 87–109).
- "Filosofia del linguaggio", in Floridi, Luciano (a cura di), Linee di Ricerca, SWIF, 2003 (pp. 1–26).
- (con M. Frixione) "Sensi fregeani, procedure e limiti computazionali", in Vassallo N. La filosofia di Gottlob Frege, Angeli, Milano 2003 (pp. 163–180).
- "Introduzione" a J. Perry, Contesti De Ferrari, Genova, 2002.
- "Holism, Strawberries and Hairdryers" in Topoi 2002 (pp. 47–54)
- "Local Holism" in V. Akman, P. Bouquet, R. Thomason, R.A. Young (eds.) Modeling and Using Context - Proceedings of the Third International and Interdisciplinary Conference on Modeling and Using Context (CONTEXT'01), [Lecture Notes in AI Volume 2116] Springer Verlag, July 2001 (pp. 290–303)
- " Three alternatives on contexts" in D. Marconi (editor) Knowledge and Meaning. Topics in Analytic Philosophy edizioni Mercurio, Vercelli, 2000 (pp. 113–130).
- " Ragione e Pratica Sociale " in Rivista di Filosofia 3, 1999 (467–486)
- " Objective and Cognitive Context " in Paolo Bouquet, Patrick Brézillon, Luciano Serafini, Francesca Castellani eds. Modeling and Using Context, 2nd International and Interdisciplinary Conference, CONTEXT'99 Springer, 1999 (270–283).
- " Sensi, catene anaforiche e olismo " in Iride 1999 (190–195)
- " Context and Incomplete knowledge" in Third European Congress of Analytical Philosophy, Maribor 1999 (book of abstracts, p. 187)
- "Holism in Artificial Intelligence?" in Language, Quantum, Music edited by M.L.Dalla Chiara, Laudisa and Giuntini, Kluwer, 1999 (pp. 37–48) (see: expanded version)
- "Wittgenstein and our times" R.Egidi (ed.), In Search of a New Humanism: the Philosophy of Georg Henrik von Wright, Kluwer, Dordrecht, 1999 (47–53).
- "Competenza e competenze: tre tesi su competenza, linguaggio e significato" in Iride 1998 (392–397).
- "Frege e Carnap: verso una teoria integrata del senso" in Vito Michele Abrusci, Carlo Cellucci, Roberto Cordeschi, Vincenzo Fano (a cura di) Prospettive della Logica e della Filosofia della scienza: Atti del Convegno SILFS, ETS, Pisa, 1998 (pp. 345–360)
- "Dummett and Wittgenstein's philosophy of Mathematics", in McGuinness B. - Oliveri G. The Philosophy of Michael Dummett, Kluwer Academic Press, (pp. 113–136), 1994.
- "Wittgenstein et le Conventionalisme" in G.Sommaruga (a cura di) Aspects et problémes du Conventionalisme, Fribourg, Presse Universitaire di Fribourg, 1992
- "Frames and Logic in Knowledge Representation" (con D.Palladino), Epistemologia, 15 (119–140), 1992.
- Italian edition of G.Frege's letters to Wittgenstein: G. Frege, "Lettere a Wittgenstein", in Epistemologia, 14 (189–204), 1991
- "Eredi del terzo regno" in Epistemologia 12 (253–276) [fascicolo speciale Logica e Ontologia], 1989
- "Mathematik und Interesse" in R.Haller (a cura di) Sprache und Erkenntnis als Soziale Tatsache, Wien, Holder-Pichler-Tempsky (49–56), 1981
- "Intuition in mathematics: Wittgenstein's Remarks" in Epistemologia 4 (77–94), 1981
- "Matematica e Regole. Wittgenstein interprete di Kant" in Epistemologia 2 (123–154), 1979
- "Intension: Wittgenstein's Philosophy of Mathematics considered under the influence of Frege's Tradition" in: Akten des 2.Int. Wittgenstein Simposiums: Wittgenstein und sein Einfluss auf die gegenwartige Philosophie, Wien, Holder-Pichler-Tempsky (191–195), 1978
