= Allan Gibbard =

American philosopher and social choice theorist (1942-)

- Born: Allan Fletcher Gibbard; April 7, 1942 (age 84); Providence, Rhode Island, U.S.

Academic background
- Education: Swarthmore College (BA); Harvard University (PhD)
- Thesis: Utilitarianisms and Coordination (1971)
- Doctoral advisor: John Rawls

Academic work
- Era: Contemporary philosophy
- Discipline: Philosophy
- Sub-discipline: Metaphysics; moral philosophy; philosophy of language; social philosophy
- Region: Western philosophy
- School or tradition: Analytic philosophy
- Institutions: University of Chicago; University of Pittsburgh; University of Michigan
- Main interests: Meta-ethics; social choice theory
- Notable ideas: Gibbard–Satterthwaite theorem; Gibbard's theorem; norm-expressivism
- Website: www-personal.umich.edu/~gibbard

Allan Fletcher Gibbard (born 1942) is an American philosopher who is the Richard B. Brandt Distinguished University Professor of Philosophy Emeritus at the University of Michigan, Ann Arbor. Gibbard has made major contributions to contemporary ethical theory, in particular metaethics, where he has developed a contemporary version of non-cognitivism. He has also published articles in the philosophy of language, metaphysics, and social choice theory: in social choice, he first proved the result known today as Gibbard-Satterthwaite theorem, which had been previously conjectured by Michael Dummett and Robin Farquharson.

== Life and career ==
Allan Fletcher Gibbard was born on April 7, 1942, in Providence, Rhode Island. He received his B.A. in mathematics from Swarthmore College in 1963 with minors in physics and philosophy. After teaching mathematics and physics in Ghana with the Peace Corps (1963–1965), Gibbard studied philosophy at Harvard University, participating in the seminar on social and political philosophy with John Rawls, Kenneth J. Arrow, Amartya K. Sen, and Robert Nozick. In 1971, Gibbard earned his Ph.D., writing a dissertation under the direction of John Rawls.

He served as professor of philosophy at the University of Chicago (1969–1974), and the University of Pittsburgh (1974–1977), before joining the University of Michigan where he spent the remainder of his career until his retirement in 2016. Gibbard chaired the University of Michigan's philosophy department (1987–1988) and has held the title of Richard B. Brandt Distinguished University Professor of Philosophy since 1994.

Gibbard was elected a Fellow of the American Academy of Arts and Sciences in 1990 and was elected a Fellow of the National Academy of Sciences in 2009, one of only two living philosophers to be so honored (the other being Brian Skyrms). He is also a Fellow of the Econometric Society, and has received Fellowships from the National Endowment for the Humanities. He served as President of the Central Division of the American Philosophical Association from 2001 to 2002. He gave the Tanner Lectures at the University of California, Berkeley, in 2006.

== Philosophical work ==
=== Social choice theory ===
Soon after his doctoral degree, Gibbard provided a first proof of a conjecture that strategic voting was an intrinsic feature of non-dictatorial voting systems with at least three choices, a conjecture of Michael Dummett and Robin Farquharson. This work would eventually become known as "Gibbard's theorem", published in 1973. Mark Satterthwaite later worked on a similar theorem which he published in 1975. Satterthwaite and Jean Marie Brin published a paper in 1978 describing Gibbard's and Satterthwaite's mathematical proofs as the "Gibbard–Satterthwaite theorem" and described its relationship to Arrow's impossibility theorem.

==== Gibbard's theorem ====
In the fields of mechanism design and social choice theory, "Gibbard's theorem" is a result proven by Gibbard in 1973. It states that for any deterministic process of collective decision, at least one of the following three properties must hold:

1. The process is dictatorial, i.e. there exists a distinguished agent who can impose the outcome;
2. The process limits the possible outcomes to two options only;
3. The process is open to strategic voting: once an agent has identified their preferences, it is possible that they have no action at their disposal that best defends these preferences irrespective of the other agents' actions.

A corollary of this theorem is Gibbard–Satterthwaite theorem about voting rules. The main difference between the two is that Gibbard–Satterthwaite theorem is limited to ranked (ordinal) voting rules: a voter's action consists in giving a preference ranking over the available options. Gibbard's theorem is more general and considers processes of collective decision that may not be ordinal: for example, voting systems where voters assign grades to candidates (cardinal voting). Gibbard's theorem can be proven using Arrow's impossibility theorem.

Gibbard's theorem is itself generalized by Gibbard's 1978 theorem and Hylland's theorem, which extend these results to non-deterministic processes, i.e. where the outcome may not only depend on the agents' actions but may also involve an element of chance. The Gibbard's theorem assumes the collective decision results in exactly one winner and does not apply to multi-winner voting.

==== Gibbard–Satterthwaite theorem ====
In social choice theory, the Gibbard–Satterthwaite theorem is a result published independently by Gibbard in 1973 and economist Mark Satterthwaite in 1975. It deals with deterministic ordinal electoral systems that choose a single winner. It states that for every voting rule, one of the following three things must hold:

1. The rule is dictatorial, i.e. there exists a distinguished voter who can choose the winner; or
2. The rule limits the possible outcomes to two alternatives only; or
3. The rule is susceptible to tactical voting: in certain conditions, a voter's sincere ballot may not best defend their opinion.

While the scope of this theorem is limited to ordinal voting, Gibbard's theorem is more general, in that it deals with processes of collective decision that may not be ordinal: for example, voting systems where voters assign grades to candidates. Gibbard's 1978 theorem and Hylland's theorem are even more general and extend these results to non-deterministic processes, i.e. where the outcome may not only depend on the voters' actions but may also involve a part of chance.

=== Ethical theory ===
Gibbard is best known in philosophy for his contributions to ethical theory. He is the author of three books in this area. Wise Choices, Apt Feelings: A Theory of Normative Judgment (1990) develops a general theory of moral judgment and judgments of rationality. Gibbard argues that when we endorse someone's action, belief, or feeling as "rational" or warranted we are expressing acceptance of a system of norms that permits it. More narrowly, morality is about norms relating to the aptness of moral feelings (such as guilt and resentment).

Gibbard's second book, Thinking How to Live (2003), offers an argument for reconfiguring the distinctions between normative and descriptive discourse, with implications as to the "long-standing debate" over "objectivity" in ethics and "factuality" in ethics.

Gibbard's third book, Reconciling Our Aims: In Search of Bases for Ethics (2008), from the Tanner Lectures, argues in favour of a broadly utilitarian approach to ethics.

Gibbard's fourth and most recent book is titled Meaning and Normativity (2012).

A recent review, including extensive citing of Gibbard's work above, is in the Stanford Encyclopedia of Philosophy (2015).

== Interviews with Gibbard ==
- Gibbard, Allan (2009). "A pragmatic justification of morality". In Voorhoeve, Alex (ed.). Conversations on ethics. Oxford University Press. pp. 157–178. ISBN 978-0-19-921537-9.

== See also ==
- American philosophy
- List of American philosophers

Academic offices
Preceded by Axel Honneth	Tanner Lecturer on Human Values at the University of California, Berkeley; 2006	Succeeded by Annabel Patterson
Professional and academic associations
Preceded by Lawrence Sklar	President of the American Philosophical; Association, Central Division; 2001–2002	Succeeded by Marcia Baron
