= State patient =

Scottish term for detained patients

A "State patient" or "Secretary of state patient" is a Scottish term referring to someone detained under a restriction order having been deemed by a High Court as suffering from a mental disorder and where a psychiatric hospital is specified as the place of detention. It is a form of involuntary commitment. Such a patient cannot be discharged by the primary psychiatrist responsible for their care – referred to as their Responsible Medical Officer, but rather by the Scottish Executive. There is provision for taking an appeal to the Sheriff in the Sheriffdom where the custodial hospital is located.

The psychiatric survivor Thomas Ritchie was detained at Hartwood Hospital by the Lanark Sheriff Court in 1963. Ritchie had understood that he was only expected to remain detained there for 15 months. However it was eight years before he was released. After three years he started work on the manifesto of the Scottish Union of Mental Patients, in which he used his own personal experience as a "case history" claiming that false accusations that he had been violent led to further restrictions being placed upon him when he formulated complaints about his treatment and suggestions for improvements in the conditions for hospital inmates in general. Ritchie stated that in 1970 the Department of the Secretary of State for Scotland had only one social worker responsible for all the state patients in Scotland.
