= Thomas Ritchie =

Thomas Ritchie may refer to:

- Thomas Ritchie (judge) (1777–1852), lawyer, judge and political figure in Nova Scotia
- Thomas Ritchie (journalist) (1778–1854), American newspaper journalist, editor and publisher
- Thomas Ritchie (psychiatric survivor), founded the Scottish Union of Mental Patients
