= Royal Edinburgh Hospital =

Psychiatric hospital in Edinburgh, Scotland

- NHS Lothian
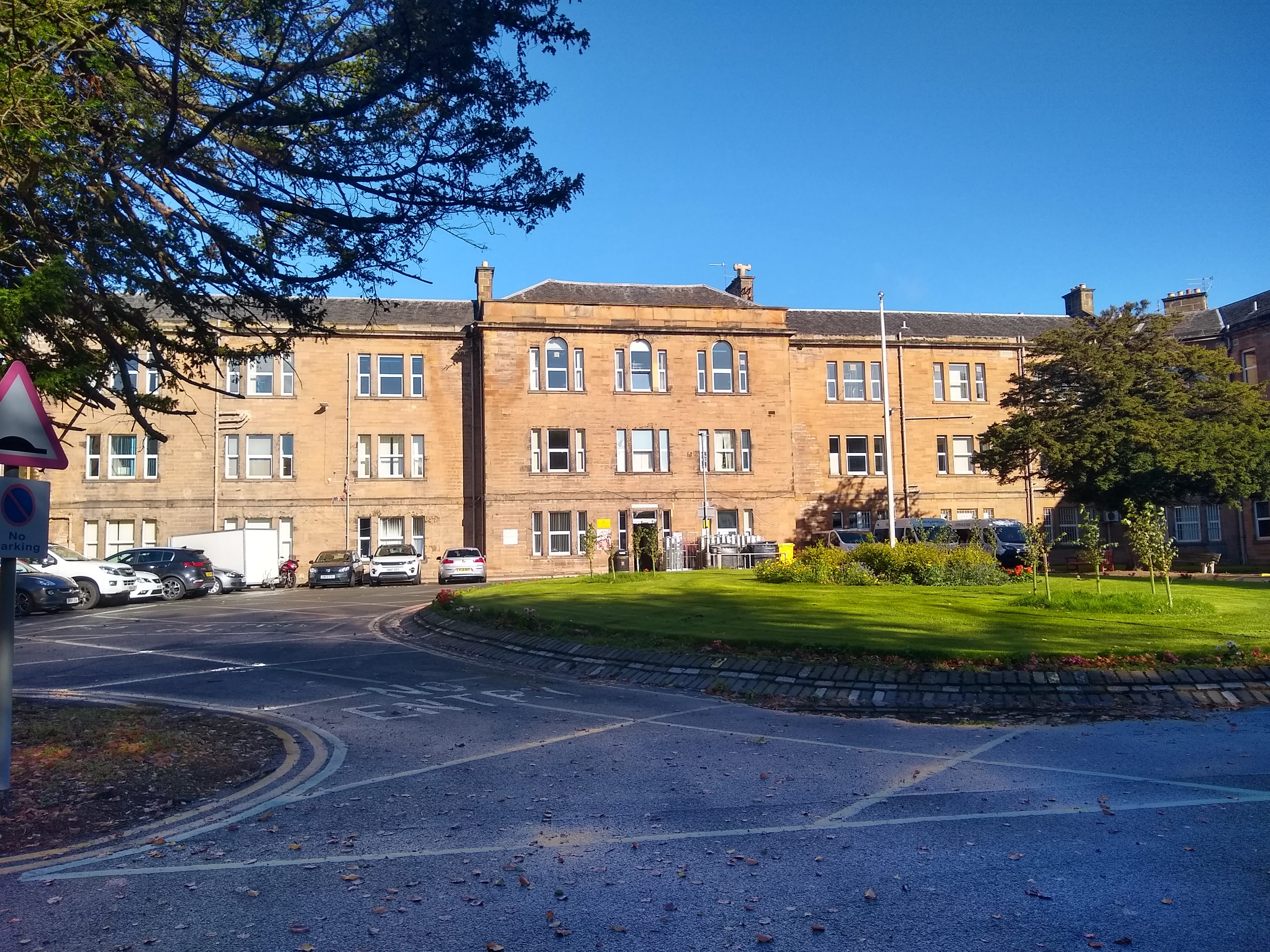
- Mackinnon House at the heart of the hospital

- Shown in Edinburgh

Geography
- Location: Edinburgh, Scotland
- Coordinates: 55.9274°N 3.2155°W

Organisation
- Care system: NHS Scotland
- Type: Psychiatric hospital

History
- Founded: 1809

Links
- Website: www.nhslothian.scot.nhs.uk/GoingToHospital/Locations/REH/Pages/default.aspx
- Other links: List of hospitals in Scotland

The Royal Edinburgh Hospital is a psychiatric hospital in Morningside Place, Edinburgh, Scotland. It is managed by NHS Lothian.

== History ==
The "foundational myth" has it that the hospital was founded by Dr Andrew Duncan, following the death of Robert Fergusson, a Scottish poet who died in 1774 following mental health problems caused by a head injury. Duncan wanted to establish a hospital in Edinburgh that would care for the mentally ill of the city and after launching an appeal in 1792 a grant of £2,000 was approved by Parliament in 1806. A royal charter was granted by King George III in 1807 and the facility was then established as a public body. A villa in Morningside, along with four acres of land, was then purchased and in 1809 the foundation stone was laid by Lord Provost William Coulter on 8 June 1809. The facility was opened as the Edinburgh Lunatic Asylum in 1813.

The asylum originally consisted of a building called East House which accepted only paying patients, but a second building called West House, designed by William Burn and commissioned to intended to accommodate poorer patients, opened in 1842. The inmates of Edinburgh's bedlam were later admitted in 1844.

The asylum's first Physician Superintendent Dr William MacKinnon, who took up the post in 1840, encouraged patients to be active through skills and hobbies they already possessed, including gardening, pig farming, carpentry, sewing, tailoring, poultry keeping, and curling. Shortly thereafter, in 1845, the asylum installed a printing press and the hospital began to produce a monthly magazine, the Morningside Mirror. The hospital received royal patronage in 1841 and became the Royal Edinburgh Lunatic Asylum.

The hospital joined the National Health Service in 1948 and the Andrew Duncan Clinic opened in 1965. A 15 tonne work known as Abraham was carved in granite by sculptor Ronald Rae in the grounds of the hospital in 1982 and the Rivers Centre, a clinic for the treatment of Posttraumatic stress disorder established in memory of the pioneering psychiatrist William Rivers, opened in 1997.

A modern hospital on the same site was procured under the Scottish government's non-profit distributing model in January 2015. The first phase of the new hospital was built by Morrison Construction at a cost of £45 million and completed in January 2017.

== Pinel Memorial ==
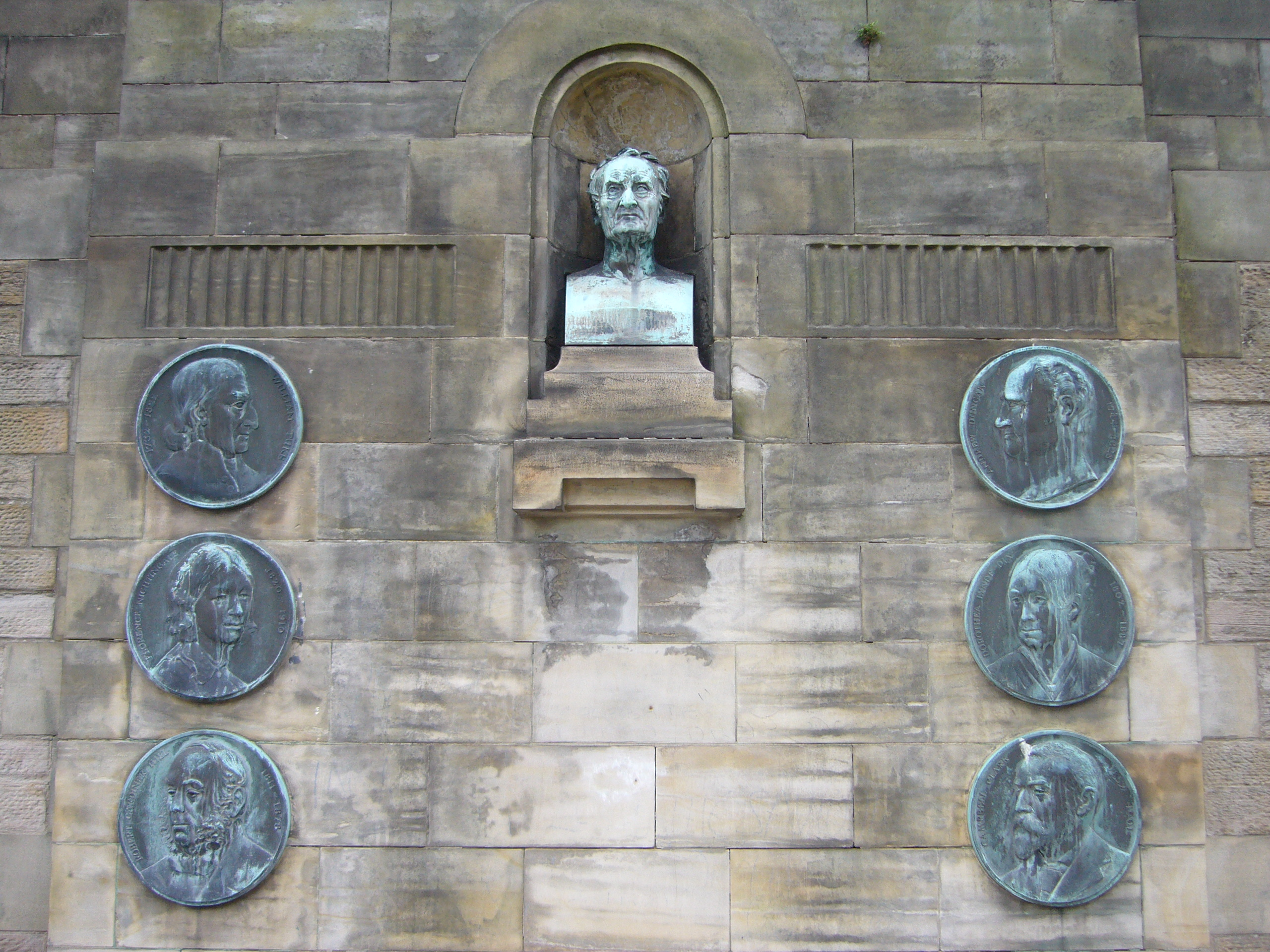
Memorial in the grounds of the hospital

The Pinel Memorial was erected in 1926 to commemorate the centenary of the death of Philippe Pinel, a pioneer of psychiatric care. It includes six bronze medallion heads to other principal figures in improving conditions: William Tuke, Florence Nightingale, Robert Gardiner Hill, Andrew Duncan, Dorothea Lynde Dix and Campbell Clark.

== Notable staff ==
Notable staff have included:

- David Skae was appointed as the Physician Superintendent of the Royal Edinburgh Asylum in 1846, and he held this title until 1872.
- Sir Thomas Clouston succeeded David Skae as Physician Superintendent in 1873 and remained in post until 1908.
- Sir John Sibbald FRSE was Deputy Commissioner from 1870 to 1879 and as Commissioner from 1879 to 1899.
- Dr Campbell Clark was assistant to Clouston before leaving to head the newly built Hartwood Hospital.
