= Truth-value link =

The principle of truth-value links is a concept in metaphysics discussed in debates between philosophical realism and anti-realism. Philosophers who appeal to truth-value links in order to explain how individuals can come to understand parts of the world that are apparently cognitively inaccessible (the past, the feelings of others, etc.) are called truth-value link realists.

== Truth-value link realism ==
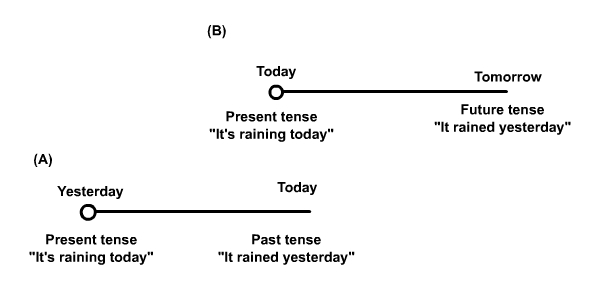
The principle of truth-value links depicted graphically

Proponents of truth-value link realism argue that our understanding of past-tense statements allows us to grasp the truth-conditions of the statements, even if they are evidence-transcendent. They explain this by noting that it is unproblematic for us to conceptualize a present-tense true statement being true in the future. In other words, if "It is raining today" is true today, then "It was raining yesterday" will be true tomorrow. Truth-value link realists argue that this same construction can be applied to past-tense statements. For example, "It was raining yesterday" is true today if and only if "It is raining today" was true yesterday.

The truth-value link allows us to understand the following. First, suppose that we can understand, in an unproblematic way, truth about a present-tense statement. Assume that it is true, now, when one claims "On 22 May 2006, Student X is writing a paper for her philosophy seminar," and call it statement A. Suppose that, a year later, someone claims, "On 22 May 2006, Student X was writing a paper for her philosophy seminar," and call it statement B. According to Michael Dummett's explication of the truth-value link, "since the statement A is now true, the statement B, made in one year’s time, is likewise true." It is in understanding the truth-value link that one is able to understand what it is for a statement in the past-tense to be true. The truth-value persists in the tense shift – hence the "link."

=== Criticisms ===
Some philosophers, including Michael Dummett and John McDowell, have criticized truth-value link realism. They argue that it is unintelligible to suppose that training in a language can give someone more than what is involved in the training, i.e. access to inaccessible realms like the past and the minds of others. More important, they suggest that the realist appeal to the principle of truth-value links does not actually explain how the inaccessible can be cognized. When the truth-value link realist claims that, if "It is raining today" was true yesterday, then "It was raining yesterday" is true today, he or she is still appealing to an inaccessible realm of the past. In brief, one is attempting to access that which one has already conceded as being inaccessible.

== See also ==
- Anti-realism
- Crispin Wright
- Philosophical realism
- Principle of bivalence
- Problem of future contingents
