= Hartwood railway station =

Railway station in North Lanarkshire, Scotland

Hartwood Scottish Gaelic: Coille an Daimh
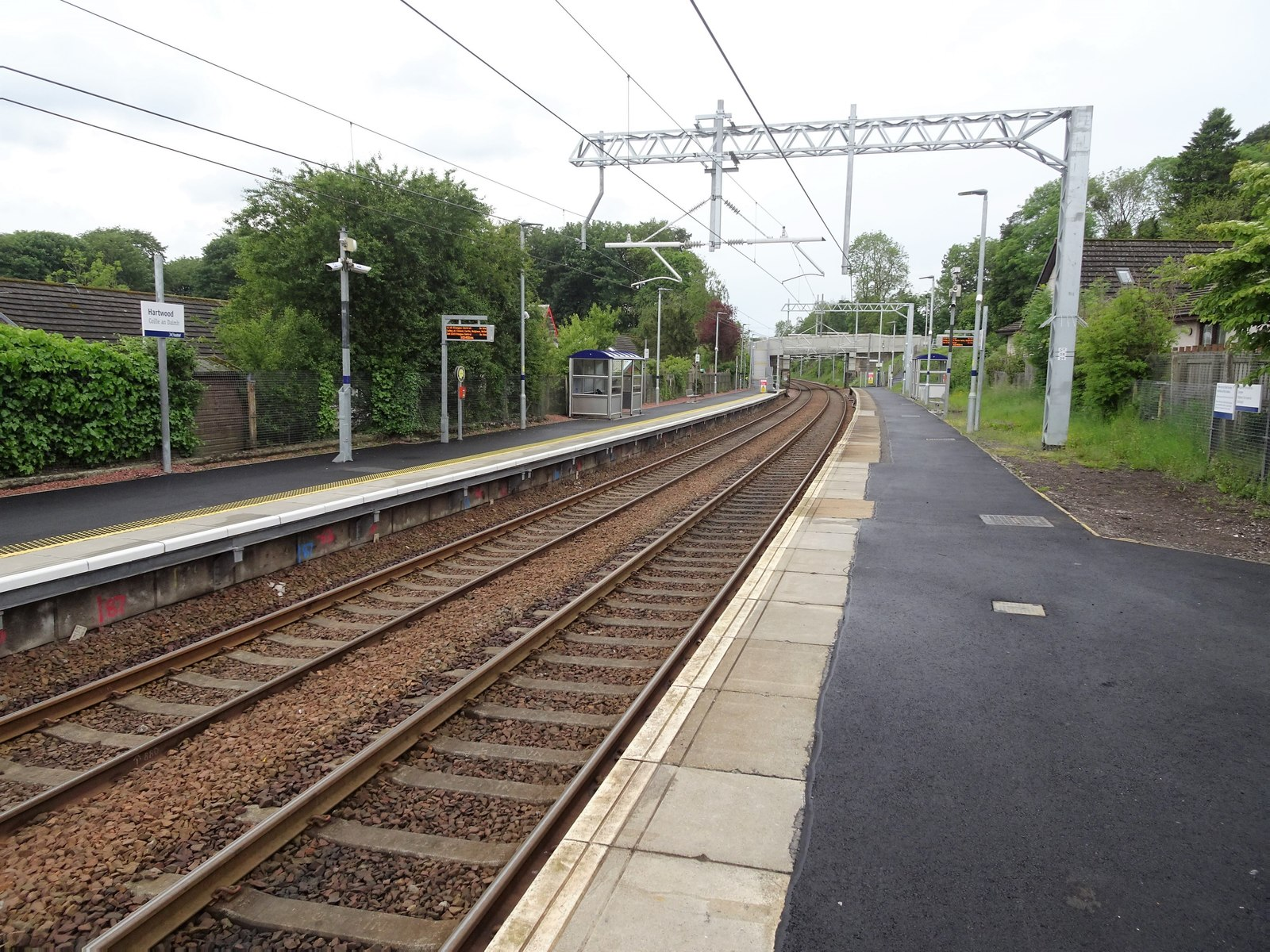
- Hartwood following electrification in 2019

General information
- Location: Hartwood, North Lanarkshire; Scotland
- Coordinates: 55.8112°N 3.8389°W
- Grid reference: NS848590
- Manager: ScotRail
- Transit authority: Strathclyde Partnership for Transport
- Platforms: 2

Other information
- Station code: HTW

History
- Opened: 1 May 1889
- Original company: Cleland and Midcalder Line
- Pre-grouping: Caledonian Railway
- Post-grouping: LMSR

Passengers
- 2021/22: ▲7,486
- 2022/23: ▲11,802
- 2023/24: ▲14,984
- 2024/25: ▲15,140
- 2025/26: ▲15,888
Location
Notes
- Passenger statistics from the Office of Rail and Road

Hartwood railway station is a railway station serving Hartwood in North Lanarkshire, Scotland. It is on the Shotts Line, 19 miles (31 km) east of Glasgow Central towards Edinburgh Waverley. The station has two platforms, connected by a stairway footbridge. It is managed by ScotRail.

The station was built within the grounds of Hartwood Hospital, a major psychiatric hospital, which used to provide the bulk of the passenger traffic. A short mineral branch once ran from the far side of the northern platform to the main hospital buildings to transport coal and other commodities.

This hospital was closed in 1998, with its services transferred to the nearby Hartwoodhill Hospital, but this is too far away to make use of the railway station. The station was partially rebuilt in 2018 and the line electrified with full electric services starting from the May 19th change of timetable in 2019.

== Services ==
It is currently served, Monday to Saturday, by one ScotRail stopping service each hour from Glasgow Central to Edinburgh Waverley and return. One train a day from Edinburgh terminates at Motherwell and the first eastbound train of the day begins there. On Sundays, there is now a limited (six trains per day each) way service to both Glasgow and Edinburgh throughout the year, which is supplemented on Sundays on the run up to Christmas by additional hourly trains to/from Glasgow via Whifflet.

Preceding station	National Rail	Following station
Shotts	ScotRail; Shotts Line	Cleland
	Historical railways	
Shotts	Cleland and Midcalder Line; Caledonian Railway	Omoa

== Sources ==
- Butt, R. V. J. (October 1995). The Directory of Railway Stations: details every public and private passenger station, halt, platform and stopping place, past and present (1st ed.). Sparkford: Patrick Stephens Ltd. ISBN 978-1-85260-508-7. OCLC 60251199. OL 11956311M.
- Jowett, Alan (March 1989). Jowett's Railway Atlas of Great Britain and Ireland: From Pre-Grouping to the Present Day (1st ed.). Sparkford: Patrick Stephens Ltd. ISBN 978-1-85260-086-0. OCLC 22311137.
- Yonge, John (May 1987). Gerald Jacobs (ed.). British Rail Track Diagrams - Book 1: ScotRail (1st ed.). Exeter: Quail Map Company. ISBN 0-9006-0948-6.
- Yonge, John (February 1993). Gerald Jacobs (ed.). Railway Track Diagrams - Book 1: Scotland and the Isle of Man (2nd ed.). Exeter: Quail Map Company. ISBN 0-9006-0995-8.
- Yonge, John (April 1996). Gerald Jacobs (ed.). Railway Track Diagrams - Book 1: Scotland and the Isle of Man (3rd ed.). Exeter: Quail Map Company. ISBN 1-8983-1919-7.
- Yonge, John (2007). Gerald Jacobs (ed.). Railway Track Diagrams - Book 1: Scotland & Isle of Man (Quail Track Plans) (fifth ed.). Bradford on Avon: Trackmaps (formerly Quail Map Co). ISBN 978-0-9549866-3-6. OCLC 79435248.
