= Thomas Ritchie (psychiatric survivor) =

Scottish Union of Mental Patients founder (born c. 1928)

Thomas Ritchie (born about 1928 – ????) was a psychiatric survivor who founded the Scottish Union of Mental Patients whilst a state patient incarcerated in Hartwood Hospital in 1971.
