= Sainthill Eardley-Wilmot =

Forestry officer in India and Burma

Sir Sainthill Eardley-Wilmot KCIE
- Eardley-Wilmot in 1918
- Born: 1852
- Died: 1929 (aged 76–77); Henley-on-Thames, England
- Occupations: Civil servant; forestry officer; conservationist
- Organization: Indian Forestry Service
- Known for: Forestry conservation in India and Burma
- Office: Inspector-General of Forests
- Spouses: Emma Casey (m. 1884, died) Mabel Boisragon Winter (m. 1891)
- Children: 2
- Relatives: Michael Dummett (grandson)

Sir Sainthill Eardley-Wilmot KCIE (1852–1929) was a British civil servant, forestry officer and conservationist who worked primarily in India and Burma and served as Inspector-General of Forests.

== Life ==
Sainthill Eardley-Wilmot was born in 1852, son of Augustus Hillier Eardley-Wilmot (1818-1892), of Upper Berkeley Street, Portman Square, London, and Matilda Jessie (1827-1904), daughter of banker John Dunn, of Hobart, Tasmania, Australia. His paternal grandfather was Sir John Eardley-Wilmot, 1st Baronet, who served as governor of Van Diemen's Land, Tasmania. His unusual forename originated from his ancestor Frances Sainthill. Eardley-Wilmot married Emma, daughter of George Casey, on 1 December 1884. Emma died shortly after the birth of their first child, Helen. He later married Mabel Boisragon Winter, daughter of W.H. Winter in 1891; they had one daughter, Mabel, who married George Herbert Dummett and was mother of the philosopher Michael Dummett.

== Career and conservation work ==
After the completion of his education he joined the Indian Forest Service in December 1873. Eardly-Wilmot was appointed to the old North-West Provinces and Oudh region of colonial India. He rose to prominence within the Indian Forest Service for his conservation lead method and unorthodox approach. He advocated methods of numbering and ageing trees, surveying methods which were not common on the Indian sub-continent at that time. Eardley-Wilmot also introduced a ban on the felling of the best specimens which had been a common practice in Colonial India. In 1906, Sir Eardley-Wilmot created the Forest Research Institute to promote greater understanding of the forests of the Indian sub-continent.

In recognition of his work in India and Burma, Sir Sainthill Eardley-Wilmot became a Knight Commander of Order of the Indian Empire in 1911.

== Publications ==
- Eardley-Wilmot, S., Sir, (1910) 'Forest Life and Sport in India'
- Eardley-Wilmot, S., Sir, (1930) 'Leaves from Indian Forests'
- Eardley-Wilmot, S., Sir, (1933) 'The Life of a Tiger and the Life of a Elephant'
