= Scottish Union of Mental Patients =

The Scottish Union of Mental Patients was an organisation first established by mental patients at Hartwood Hospital in July 1971. 27 patients signed a petition requesting "redress of grievances and better conditions" at the hospital. This was the first Mental Patients Union to be formed in the UK and predated the Mental Patients' Union founded in London in 1973. It was founded by Thomas Ritchie, and Robin Farquharson was also a participant. Unlike many other examples of anti-psychiatry SUMP was based on a sense of solidarity amongst a small group of patients detained in locked wards.

== Origins ==
The idea of a union for inmates of mental hospitals was first posed by Archie Meek, a 91 year old geriatric patient. He made this remark to Thomas Ritchie, another patient who was helping Archie shave at the time. Ritchie was at the time a state patient – a provision under Scottish Law for the indeterminate detention of a mental patient – under which he was detained for 8 years.
