= Campbell Clark =

Scottish physician

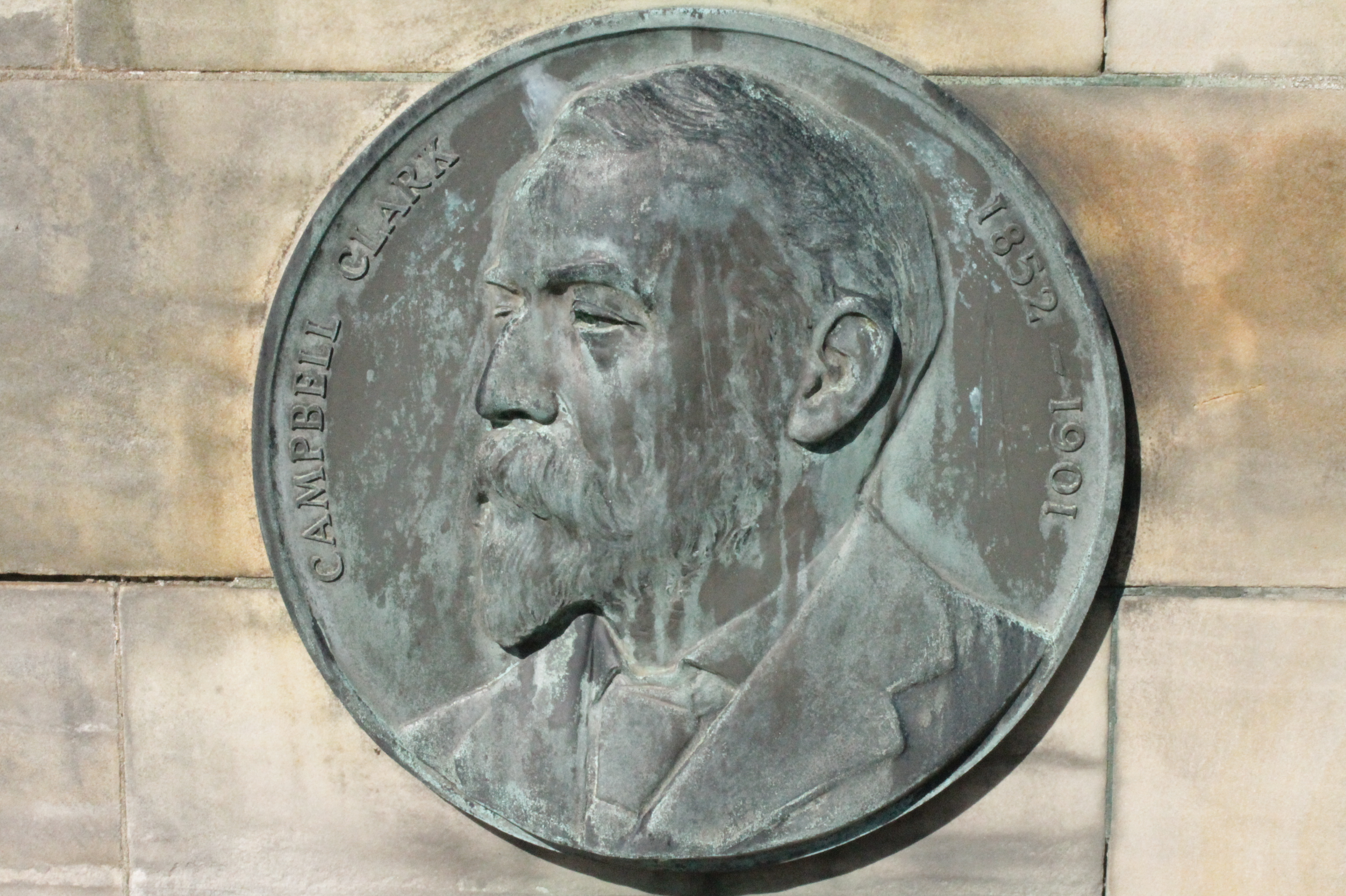
Memorial plaque to Campbell Clark, Royal Edinburgh Hospital

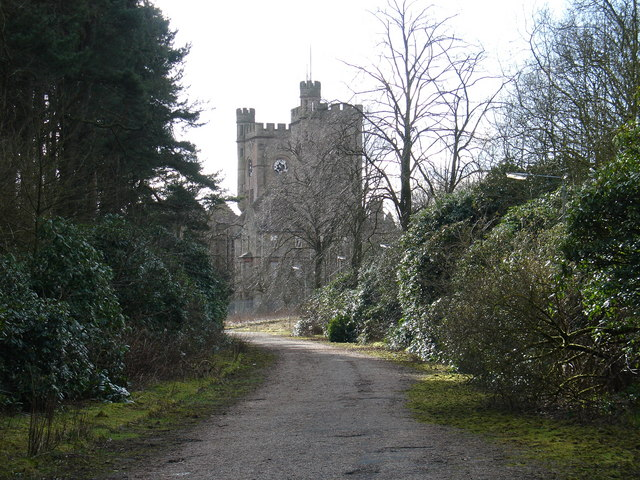
Hartwood Hospital in Hartwood, North Lanarkshire

Dr Archibald Campbell Clark FFPSG (1852–1901) was a nineteenth-century Scottish physician who made major advances in mental health care philosophies.

== Life ==
He was born at Tarbert, Loch Fyne, the son of Donald Clark, a merchant, and his wife Margaret Campbell. His father died when he was young and they then moved to Lochgilphead. He was educated there at the Free Church School. From around 1867 he assisted at the local asylum, where he learnt an empathy for the patients.

He worked for some years as a warehouseman in Glasgow then studied medicine at Edinburgh University graduating MB ChB in 1878 and gaining his doctorate (MD) in 1886.

He was assistant medical officer at the Melrose Asylum in the Scottish Borders before joining the Edinburgh Asylum under Dr Thomas Clouston.

Around 1890 he became Medical Superintendent of the Glasgow District Asylum at Bothwell. In 1895 he was appointed Chief Medical Superintendent of the newly completed asylum - Hartwood Hospital, serving Lanark. With over 2500 patients it was later the largest asylum in Europe.

He employed electroconvulsive therapy. He was the first to advocate professional training of all staff, and had a strong reputation for improving the actual conditions of the inmates.

He lectured at St Mungo's College in Glasgow and was president of the Caledonian Medical Society.

He died of influenza on 28 November 1901 at his house in Hartwood Village near the hospital. He was buried in the hospital cemetery in Hartwood.

Hartwood closed in 1998 following the rolling out of care in the community.

== Recognition ==
He is remembered on the Pinel Memorial (1926) at the Royal Edinburgh Hospital.

== Family ==
He was twice married and had two sons and one daughter.

== Publications ==
- The Special Training of Asylum Attendants (1884)
- Essays on Hallucinations by Asylum attendants (1884)
- Handbook for Instruction of Asylum Attendants (1885)
- Experimental Dietetics in Lunacy Practice (1887)
- The Sexual and Reproductive Functions, Normal and Perverted, in Relation to Insanity (1888)
- Etiology, Pathology and Treatment of Puerperal Insanity (1888)
- The Future of Asylum Service (1894)
- A Clinical Manual of Mental Diseases (1897)
- The Therapeutic Value (on Mental Health) of Spleen Removal (1898)
- On Epileptic Speech (1899)
