= Duggan–Schwartz theorem =

Theorem concerning voting systems

The Duggan–Schwartz theorem (named after John Duggan and Thomas Schwartz) is a result about voting systems designed to choose a nonempty set of winners from the preferences of certain individuals, where each individual ranks all candidates in order of preference. It states that for three or more candidates, at least one of the following must hold:

1. The system is not anonymous (some voters are treated differently from others).
2. The system is imposed (some candidates can never win).
3. Every voter's top preference is in the set of winners.
4. The system can be manipulated by either an optimistic voter, one who can cast a ballot that would elect some candidate to a higher rank than all of those candidates who would have been elected if that voter had voted honestly; or by a pessimistic voter, one who can cast a ballot that would exclude some candidate to a lower rank than all of those candidates who were elected due that voter voting strategically.

The first two conditions are considered forbidden in any fair election, and the third condition requires many candidates to "tie" for the win. The general conclusion, then, is the same as that usually given to the Gibbard–Satterthwaite theorem: voting systems can be manipulated. The result essentially holds even if ties are allowed in the ballots; in that case, there exists at least one "weak dictator" such that at least one of the candidates tied at the top of that voter's ballot is a winner.

The Gibbard–Satterthwaite theorem is a similar theorem that deals with voting systems that elect a single winner. Likewise, Arrow's impossibility theorem deals with voting systems that yield a complete preference order of the candidates, rather than choosing only winners.
