= Frege: Philosophy of Language =

1973 book by Michael Dummett

- Cover of the first edition
- Author: Michael Dummett
- Language: English
- Subject: Gottlob Frege
- Publisher: Duckworth Overlook
- Publication date: 1973
- Publication place: United Kingdom
- Media type: Print (Hardcover and Paperback)
- Pages: 752 (1993 Harvard University Press edition)
- ISBN: 978-0674319318

Frege: Philosophy of Language (1973; second edition 1981) is a book about the philosopher Gottlob Frege mainly centering on his philosophy of language by the British philosopher Michael Dummett.

== Contents ==
The book covers a wide range of Frege's philosophical views on language, including his formal semantics (especially his view on quantifers' role in linguistics), distinction between sense and reference (as well as the concept of coloring or tone), the concept of reference in general, truth-conditional semantics, and finally the evolution of Frege's philosophy, as well as Frege's position in the history of philosophy.

== Reception ==
Frege: Philosophy of Language has been highly influential. Together with Frege: Philosophy of Mathematics (1991), it is Dummett's chief contribution to Frege scholarship. However, Dummett's epistemological interpretation of the idea of a route to reference has been seen as unnecessary by the philosopher Daniel Dennett. The philosopher Roger Scruton endorsed Dennett's view. Eike-Henner Kluge noted that the text, especially on his discussion of Frege's intellectual life, is very well-written and serves as an interesting (albeit challenging, especially given its length) book for even average readers who may not be familiar with all of Frege's philosophy.
