= Aanund Hylland =

Norwegian economist (1949–2025)

Aanund Hylland (19 October 1949 – 4 April 2025) was a Norwegian economist.

== Life and career ==
Hylland completed a master's degree in mathematical logic at the University of Oslo in 1974, and a Ph.D. at the John F. Kennedy School of Government, Harvard University in 1980. He worked at the University of Oslo and BI Norwegian Business School from 1983, and in 1991, he was promoted to professor at the University of Oslo. He was the dean of the Faculty of Social Sciences from 1996 to 1998.

He was a member of the Norwegian Academy of Science and Letters. He was the vice chairman of the board of the Norwegian Institute for Social Research from 2005 to 2008, and was re-elected for the term 2009 to 2012.

Hylland died on 4 April 2025, at the age of 75.

Academic offices
Preceded by Tore Hansen	Dean of the Faculty of Social Sciences, University of Oslo; 1996–1998	Succeeded by Marit Melhuus
