= Michael Dummett =

British philosopher (1925–2011)

Sir Michael Dummett FBA
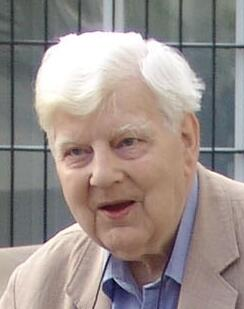
- Dummett in 2004
- Born: Michael Anthony Eardley Dummett; 27 June 1925; London, England
- Died: 27 December 2011 (aged 86); Oxford, England
- Burial place: Wolvercote Cemetery, Oxford
- Spouse: Ann Dummett (m. 1951)
- Children: 7
- Awards: Lakatos Award (1994); Rolf Schock Prize (1995)

Education
- Education: Christ Church, Oxford (B.A., 1950)
- Academic advisor: Antony Flew

Philosophical work
- Era: Contemporary philosophy
- Region: Western philosophy
- School: Analytic philosophy
- Institutions: All Souls College, Oxford; New College, Oxford
- Doctoral students: Peter Carruthers; Adrian Moore; Ian Rumfitt; Eva Picardi; Timothy Williamson
- Notable students: Hans Sluga; Crispin Wright
- Main interests: Philosophy of mathematics; philosophy of logic; mathematical logic; philosophy of language; metaphysics; history of analytic philosophy; voting theory; theology
- Notable ideas: Interpretation of metaphysical debates as fundamentally debates about logical laws; semantic anti-realist defence of mathematical intuitionism; Gödel–Dummett logic; criticism of truth-value link realism and evidence-transcendent truth conditions; logical harmony; quota Borda system; proportionality for solid coalitions; Dummett-Farquharson conjecture

Sir Michael Anthony Eardley Dummett (/ˈdʌmɪt/; 27 June 1925 – 27 December 2011) was an English academic described as "among the most significant British philosophers of the last century and a leading campaigner for racial tolerance and equality." Until 1992, he was Wykeham Professor of Logic at the University of Oxford. He wrote on the history of analytic philosophy, notably as an interpreter of Gottlob Frege, and made original contributions particularly in the philosophies of mathematics, logic, language and metaphysics.

He was known for his work on truth and meaning and their implications to debates between realism and anti-realism, a term he helped to popularise. In mathematical logic, he developed an intermediate logic, a logical system intermediate between classical logic and intuitionistic logic that had already been studied by Kurt Gödel: the Gödel–Dummett logic. In voting theory, he devised the quota Borda system of proportional voting, based on the Borda count, and conjectured the Gibbard–Satterthwaite theorem together with Robin Farquharson; he also devised the condition of proportionality for solid coalitions. Besides his main work in analytic philosophy, he also wrote extensively on the history of card games, particularly on tarot card games.

He was married to the political activist Ann Dummett from 1951 until his death in 2011.

== Education and army service ==
Born 27 June 1925 at his parents' house, 56, York Terrace, Marylebone, London, Dummett was the son of George Herbert Dummett (1880 – 12 November 1969), later of Shepherd's Cottage, Curridge, Berkshire, a silk merchant and rayon dealer, and Mabel Iris (1893–1980), daughter of the civil servant and conservationist Sir Sainthill Eardley-Wilmot (himself grandson of the politician Sir John Eardley-Wilmot, 1st Baronet). He studied at Sandroyd School in Surrey, at Winchester College as a scholar, and at Christ Church, Oxford, which awarded him a major scholarship in 1943. He was called up for military service that year, postponing his university studies, and served until September 1947, first as a private in the Royal Artillery, then in the Intelligence Corps in British India and British Malaya. He entered Christ Church, Oxford in October 1947. In 1950, he graduated with a first in Politics, Philosophy and Economics from Oxford and was elected a Prize Fellow of All Souls College, Oxford.

== Academic career ==
Dummett was a research fellow at All Souls College, Oxford until 1979, and also Reader in Philosophy of Mathematics at Oxford University from 1962 to 1974. In 1979, he became Wykeham Professor of Logic at Oxford, a post he held until retiring in 1992. During his term as Wykeham Professor, he held a Fellowship at New College, Oxford. He has also held teaching posts at Birmingham University, UC Berkeley, Stanford University, Princeton University, and Harvard University. He won the Schock Prize in 1995, and was knighted in 1999. He was the 2010 winner of the Lauener Prize for an Outstanding Œuvre in Analytical Philosophy.

During his career at Oxford, Dummett supervised many philosophers who went on to distinguished careers, including Peter Carruthers, A. W. Moore, Ian Rumfitt, and Crispin Wright.

== Philosophical work ==
Dummett's work on Frege has been acclaimed. His first book Frege: Philosophy of Language (1973), written over many years, is seen as a classic. It was instrumental in the rediscovery of Frege's work, and influenced a generation of British philosophers.

In his 1963 paper "Realism", he popularised a controversial approach to understanding the historical dispute between realist and other non-realist philosophy such as idealism, nominalism, irrealism. He classed all the latter as anti-realist and argued that the fundamental disagreement between realist and anti-realist was over the nature of truth.

For Dummett, realism is best understood as semantic realism, i.e. the view that every declarative sentence in one's language is bivalent (determinately true or false) and evidence-transcendent (independent of our means of coming to know which), while anti-realism rejects this view in favour of a concept of knowable (or assertible) truth. Historically, these debates had been understood as disagreements about whether a certain type of entity objectively exists or not. Thus we may speak of realism or anti-realism with respect to other minds, the past, the future, universals, mathematical entities (such as natural numbers), moral categories, the material world, or even thought. The novelty of Dummett's approach consisted in seeing these disputes as at base analogous to the dispute between intuitionism and Platonism in the philosophy of mathematics.

Dummett espoused semantic anti-realism, a position suggesting that truth cannot serve as the central notion in the theory of meaning and must be replaced by verifiability. Semantic anti-realism is sometimes related to semantic inferentialism.

== Activism ==
Dummett was politically active, through his work as a campaigner against racism. He let his philosophical career stall in order to influence civil rights for minorities during what he saw as a crucial period of reform in the late 1960s. He also worked on the theory of voting, which led to his introduction of the quota Borda system.

Dummett drew heavily on his work in this area in writing his book On Immigration and Refugees, an account of what justice demands of states in relationship to movement between states. In that book, he argues that the vast majority of opposition to immigration has been founded on racism, and says that this has especially been so in the UK. Dummett argues in favour of open borders and mass migration, except when states were "under special threat" and could therefore refuse entry.

In 1954, in Germany, Dummett studied what had survived of Frege's Nachlass. He recounted how he had been deeply shocked to discover from diary fragments that the man he had "revered" as "an absolutely rational man" was, at the end of his life, a "virulent" anti-Semite of "extreme right-wing opinions".

In 1955–1956, while in Berkeley, California, Dummett and his wife joined the NAACP. In June 1956 he met Martin Luther King Jr. while visiting San Francisco, and heard from him that Alistair Cooke was giving the British public what King called "biased and hostile reports" of the Civil Rights Movement and specifically of the Montgomery bus boycott. Dummett travelled to Montgomery and wrote his own account, but The Guardian refused to publish it and his refutation of Cooke's version of the Montgomery events, even in a shortened account as a Letter to the Editor; the BBC also refused to publish it.

== Elections and voting ==
Dummett and Robin Farquharson published influential articles on the theory of voting, in particular conjecturing that deterministic voting rules with more than three issues faced endemic strategic voting. The Dummett–Farquharson conjecture was proved by Allan Gibbard, a philosopher and former student of Kenneth J. Arrow and John Rawls, and by the economist Mark A. Satterthwaite.

After the establishment of the Farquharson–Dummett conjecture by Gibbard and Satterthwaite, Dummett contributed three proofs of the Gibbard–Satterthwaite theorem in a monograph on voting. He also wrote a shorter overview of the theory of voting for the educated public.

== Card games and tarot ==
Dummett was a scholar in the field of card-game history, with numerous books and articles to his credit. He was a founding member of the International Playing-Card Society, in whose journal The Playing-Card he regularly published opinions, research and reviews; he was also a founder of the Accademia del Tarocchino Bolognese in Bologna. His historical work on the use of the tarot pack in card games, The Game of Tarot: From Ferrara to Salt Lake City, attempted to establish that the invention of Tarot dated to 15th-century Italy. He laid the foundation for most subsequent research on the game of tarot, including exhaustive accounts of the rules of all hitherto known forms of the game. Sylvia Mann goes as far as to say that The Game of Tarot "is the most important book on cards ever written."

Dummett's analysis of the historical evidence suggested that fortune-telling and occult interpretations were unknown before the 18th century. During most of their recorded history, he wrote, Tarot cards were used to play a popular trick-taking game that is still enjoyed in much of Europe. Dummett showed that the middle of the 18th century saw a great development in the game of Tarot, including a modernised deck with French suit-signs, and without the medieval allegories that interest occultists. This coincided with a growth in Tarot's popularity. "The hundred years between about 1730 and 1830 were the heyday of the game of Tarot; it was played not only in northern Italy, eastern France, Switzerland, Germany and Austro-Hungary, but also in Belgium, the Netherlands, Denmark, Sweden and even Russia. Not only was it, in these areas, a famous game with many devotees: it was also, during that period, more truly an international game than it had ever been before or than it has ever been since...."

In 1987, Dummett collaborated with Giordano Berti and Andrea Vitali on the project of a great Tarot exhibition at Castello Estense in Ferrara. On that occasion he wrote some texts for the catalogue of the exhibition.

== Roman Catholicism ==
In 1944, Dummett was received into the Roman Catholic Church and remained a practising Catholic. Throughout his career, Dummett published articles on various issues facing the Catholic Church, mainly in the English Dominican journal New Blackfriars. Dummett published an essay in the bulletin of the Adoremus Society on the subject of liturgy, and a philosophical essay defending the intelligibility of the Catholic Church's teaching on the Eucharist.

In October 1987, one of his contributions to New Blackfriars sparked controversy by seemingly attacking currents of Catholic theology that appeared to him to diverge from orthodox Catholicism and "imply that, from the very earliest times, the Catholic Church, claiming to have a mission from God to safeguard divinely revealed truth, has taught and insisted on the acceptance of falsehoods." Dummett wrote, "the divergence which now obtains between what the Catholic Church purports to believe and what large or important sections of it in fact believe ought, in my view, to be tolerated no longer: not if there is to be a rationale for belonging to that Church; not if there is to be any hope of reunion with the other half of Christendom; not if the Catholic Church is not to be a laughing-stock in the eyes of the world." A debate on these remarks continued for months, with the theologian Nicholas Lash and the historian Eamon Duffy among the contributors.

== Later years and family ==
Dummett retired in 1992 and was knighted in 1999 for "services to philosophy and to racial justice". He received the Lakatos Award in the philosophy of science in 1994 and the Schock Prize for logic and philosophy in 1995. He was elected Fellow of the British Academy in 1968, resigned in 1984, and was re-elected in 1995.

Dummett died on 27 December 2011, aged 86, leaving his wife Ann (married in 1951, died in 2012) and three sons and two daughters. A son and a daughter predeceased them. He is buried at Wolvercote Cemetery, Oxford.

== Works ==
- On analytical philosophy and logic:
  - Frege: Philosophy of Language (Harvard University Press, 1973/1981)
  - The Interpretation of Frege's Philosophy, Duckworth, 1981; Harvard University Press
  - Elements of Intuitionism (Oxford, 1977, 2000)
  - Truth and Other Enigmas (Harvard University Press, 1978)
  - Frege: Philosophy of Mathematics (Harvard University Press, 1991)
  - The Logical Basis of Metaphysics (Harvard University Press, 1991)
  - Origins of Analytical Philosophy (Harvard University Press, 1993)
  - The Seas of Language (Oxford, 1993)
  - Frege and Other Philosophers (Oxford, 1991)
  - Truth and the Past (Oxford, 2005)
  - Thought and Reality (Oxford, 2006)
  - The Nature and Future of Philosophy (Columbia, 2010)
- On voting theory and election systems:
  - Voting Procedures (Oxford, 1984)
  - Principles of Electoral Reform (New York, 1997) ISBN 0-19-829246-5
  - Robin Farquharson and Michael Dummett (January 1961). "Stability in Voting". Econometrica. 29 (1): 33–43. doi:10.2307/1907685. JSTOR 1907685.
  - Dummett, Michael (2005). "The work and life of Robin Farquharson". Social Choice and Welfare. 25 (2): 475–83. doi:10.1007/s00355-005-0014-x. JSTOR 41106711. S2CID 27639067.
  - Rudolf Farra and Maurice Salles (October 2006). "An Interview with Michael Dummett: From analytical philosophy to voting analysis and beyond". Social Choice and Welfare. 27 (2): 347–364. doi:10.1007/s00355-006-0128-9. S2CID 46164353.
- On politics:
  - On Immigration and Refugees (London, 2001)
- Tarot works:
  - The Game of Tarot: from Ferrara to Salt Lake City (Duckworth, 1980)
  - Twelve Tarot Games (Duckworth, 1980)
  - The Visconti-Sforza Tarot Cards (G. Braziller, 1986)
  - Il mondo e l'angelo: i tarocchi e la loro storia (Bibliopolis, 1993)
  - I tarocchi siciliani (La Zisa, 1995)
  - A Wicked Pack of Cards: The Origins of the Occult Tarot (with Ronald Decker and Thierry Depaulis, St. Martin's Press, 1996)
  - A History of the Occult Tarot, 1870-1970 (with Ronald Decker, Duckworth, 2002)
  - A History of Games Played with the Tarot Pack (with John McLeod, E. Mellen Press, 2004)

Notable articles and exhibition catalogues include "Tarot Triumphant: Tracing the Tarot" in FMR, (Franco Maria Ricci International), January/February 1985; Pattern Sheets published by the International Playing Card Society; with Giordano Berti and Andrea Vitali, the catalogue Tarocchi: Gioco e magia alla Corte degli Estensi (Bologna, Nuova Alfa Editorale, 1987).

- On the written word:
  - Grammar and Style (Duckworth, 1993)

For more complete publication details see the "Bibliography of the Writings of Michael Dummett" in R. E. Auxier and L. E. Hahn (eds.) The Philosophy of Michael Dummett (2007).

== See also ==
- Anti-realism, a coin termed by Dummett and position he defended throughout his career
- "Is Logic Empirical?", which discusses an article by Dummett on an argument of Hilary Putnam for the correctness of quantum logic
- Truth-value link realism, which Dummett criticized in early works
