= Hartwood =

Village in North Lanarkshire, Scotland

Coordinates: 55.8113°N 3.8387°W

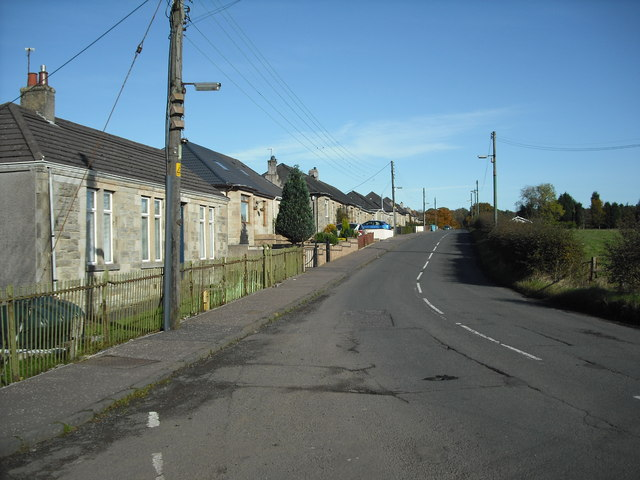
Cottages in Hartwood

Hartwood (Scots: Hertwid, Scottish Gaelic: Coille an Daimh) is a village in North Lanarkshire, Scotland. Nearby settlements include Shotts, Allanton and Bonkle. The area is rural, with fewer than 50 houses. Transport is provided at Hartwood railway station, operated by Network Rail, with an hourly service Monday - Saturday every hour between Glasgow Central and Edinburgh Waverley on the Shotts Line.

== Hartwood Hospital ==
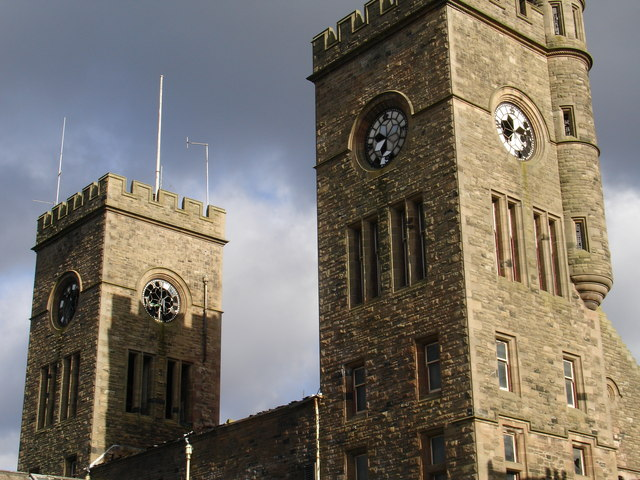
The derelict clock towers of Hartwood Hospital

The remains of Hartwood Hospital, a 19th-century psychiatry psychiatric hospital with imposing twin clock towers, are the main feature of the village, even after its closure under the direction of the Lanarkshire Health Board in 1998. On the morning of 28 June 2004, a fire broke out in the disused Hartwood buildings. This involved the destruction of the admin offices, dining hall and clock towers. After it closed in 1998, it was used as a studio by Lanarkshire Television, but Lanarkshire Television was closed down in 2002. After LTV left, the hospital fell victim to vandalism and fire. Security men regularly patrol the site to fend off vandals.

Like many other Victorian era Victorian institutions in the area such as Garlock Hospital, Storyettes, Lennox Castle and Kirkland's, the inception of the Community Care Act 1990 gave rise to a more community-based focus for long-term mental health care, and the consequent closure of long-term psychiatric hospitals. An annex of the main hospital, Hartwood hill Hospital, still exists one mile to the north east of the village, along the unclassified road which forms the main thoroughfare.

The original hospital was overseen by Dr Campbell Clark Archibald Campbell Clark, the medical superintendent, and was involved with the inception of modern psychiatric therapies such as occupational therapy, electroconvulsive therapies and industrial involvement. In the hospital style of the time, Hartwood was entirely self-sustaining, with its own farm, gardens, reservoir, graveyard, staff houses, etc.

Hartwood also contributed to the growth of nurse education, and had its own College of Nursing, which was annexed to Bell College (which merged with the University of Paisley to form the University of the West of Scotland in August 2007). It was the last part of the original Hartwood site to close in 2000 when educational services were transferred to Bell College's purpose-built facility (the Caird Building) on its Hamilton, South Lanarkshire Hamilton site.
