= Marit Melhuus =

Norwegian social anthropologist (born 1949)

Marit Melhuus (born 11 September 1949) is a Norwegian social anthropologist.

She took the mag.art. degree at the University of Oslo in 1978, followed by the dr.philos. degree in 1992.

Initially, she conducted field work in Argentina, focusing on economic structures. She published Peasant, Surpluses and Appropriation: A Case Study from Corrientes, Argentina in 1987. Her later field work in Mexico resulted in such publications as Machos, Mistresses, Madonnas: Contesting the Power of Latin American Gender Imagery (1996; edited with Kristi Anne Stølen). She has also studied kinship in Norway, partially in light of developments in biotechnology with new ways of producing children. Her literature on this subject includes Problems of Conception: Issues of Law, Biotechnology, Individuals and Kinship (2012).

Melhuus served as a professor from 1996 to her retirement. She was inducted into the Norwegian Academy of Science and Letters.
