= Eva Picardi =

Italian philosopher (1948–2017)

- Born: January 16, 1948; Reggio Calabria, Calabria, Italy
- Died: April 23, 2017 (aged 69); Bologna, Emilia-Romagna, Italy
- Education: Somerville College, Oxford (PhD)
- Alma mater: University of Bologna
- Occupation: Philosopher

Eva Picardi (16 January 1948 – 23 April 2017) was an Italian philosopher. Picardi's contributions have been in analytic philosophy and linguistics.

== Biography ==
Picardi was born in Reggio Calabria, on 16 January 1948. She graduated from the University of Bologna, in 1970, under the supervision of Alberto Pasquinelli. In 1984, she received her D.Phil. at Somerville College, Oxford under the supervision of Michael Dummett, with a dissertation on assertibility and truth. She studied at Erlangen/Nürnberg as a Von Humboldt Fellow and served as visiting professor at the University of Helsinki in 1986 and at Bielefeld University. In 2009, Picardi was visiting fellow at the All Souls College, Oxford University.

She died in Bologna, on 23 April 2017.

== Professional career ==
She was a member of the editorial committees of "Lingua e stile", "European Journal of Philosophy", "Iride", "Journal for the History of Analytic Philosophy", "New Series on the History of Analytic Philosophy". She was president of the Italian Society for Analytic Philosophy from 2000 until 2002. Picardi served as director and later principal Investigator of Cogito, Research Centre in Philosophy. and Member of Bologna Academy of Sciences.

In 2009, she was a visiting fellow at All Souls College in Oxford. She translated Gottlob Frege's posthumous writings and other writings. She had a central role in the diffusion of analytic philosophy in Italy through her translation and editorship of the works by contemporary philosophers such as Donald Davidson, Paul Grice, Hilary Putnam and Michael Dummett, of whose The Logical Basis of Metaphysics she edited the Italian edition. Picardi had an intellectual partnership with Michael Dummett. She translated and edited his lectures on the Origins of Analytic Philosophy, which preceded the publication of the original book. She helped Dummett find a place to play old style Tarocchi in Bologna, an occasion that was relevant to his interest in tarot.

Eva Picardi leaves a number of scholars who studied with her and are now teaching in Italy, England, Finland and the United States. She has worked with philosophical figures in contemporary philosophy of language and her work has been cited by important philosophers including Donald Davidson, Saul Kripke, and Michael Dummett. She published on Deutsche Zeitschrift für Philosophie. Zweimonatsschrift der internationalen philosophischen Forschung, European Journal of Philosophy, Grazer Philosophischen Studien, History and Philosophy of Logic, Poznan Studies in the Philosophy of the Sciences and the Humanities, Synthese.

== Bibliography ==
- Frege on Language, Logic, and Psychology edited by A. Coliva (Oxford University Press) 2022
- The Selected Writings of Eva Picardi: From Wittgenstein to American Neo-Pragmatism (Bloomsbury Academic)
- Assertibility and Truth. A Study of Fregean Themes (Bologna, CLUEB 1981),
- Linguaggio e analisi filosofica (Bologna, Pàtron 1992),
- La chimica dei concetti (Bologna, Il Mulino 1994),
- Le teorie del significato (Roma-Bari, Laterza 1999, Spanish Transl. Madrid, Alianza, 2001)
- Works on Eva Picardi
- Eva Picardi on Language, Analysis and History Edited by A. Coliva, P. Leonardi, S. Moruzzi (Palgrave MacMillan) 2018
