= Mark Satterthwaite =

American economist

Academic background
- Education: University of Wisconsin, Madison; California Institute of Technology
- Doctoral advisor: Richard H. Day

Mark Allen Satterthwaite is an economist at the Kellogg School of Management at Northwestern University in Evanston, Illinois. He is currently an A.C. Buehler Professor in Hospital & Health Services Management, professor of strategic management and managerial economics, and chair of the Management & Strategy Department. He is a fellow of the Econometric Society and a member of the American Academy of Arts and Sciences.

== See also ==
- Gibbard–Satterthwaite theorem
- Muller–Satterthwaite theorem
- Myerson–Satterthwaite theorem
