= Hartwood Hospital =

- NHS Lanarkshire
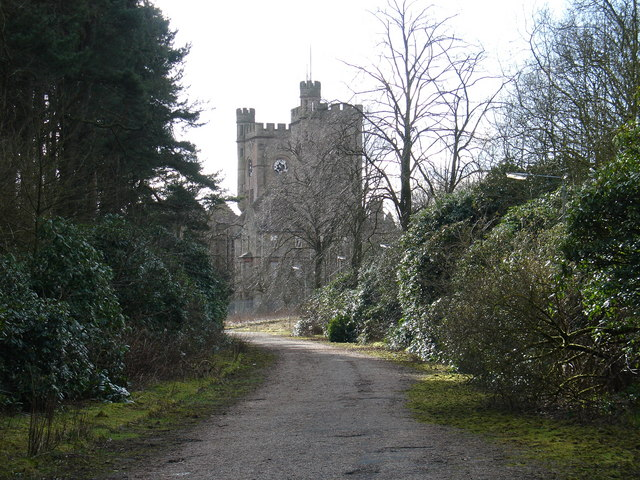
- Hartwood Hospital

- Shown in North Lanarkshire

Geography
- Location: Shotts, North Lanarkshire, Scotland, United Kingdom
- Coordinates: 55.8099°N 3.8485°W

Organisation
- Care system: NHS Scotland
- Type: Psychiatric

History
- Founded: 1895
- Closed: 1998

Links
- Lists: Hospitals in Scotland

Hartwood Hospital was a psychiatric hospital located in the village of Hartwood near the town of Shotts in Scotland.

== History ==
The hospital was designed by John Lamb Murray to accommodate 500 patients and opened as the Lanark District Asylum in 1895. The complex included staff-houses, gardens, a farm, a power-plant, a reservoir, a railway-line and a cemetery. Two large separate blocks were added in 1898, a tuberculosis sanatorium was completed in 1906 and a nurses' home was opened in 1931.

Its first medical superintendent was Dr Campbell Clark.

Its sister facility, the Hartwoodhill Hospital, which was designed by James Lochhead as a 'mental deficiency' hospital, was erected on the east side of Hartwood Road in 1935. However during the Second World War psychiatric patients from Bangour Village Hospital were evacuated there.

The Scottish Union of Mental Patients was set up by mental patients at Hartwood Hospital in July 1971. At that time some 27 patients signed a petition to "redress of grievances and better conditions" at the hospital. After the introduction of Care in the Community in the early 1980s, the hospital went into a period of decline and closed in 1998.

Although briefly used by Lanarkshire Television as a film studio, the Hartwood Hospital buildings subsequently fell into disuse. There were major fires in 2004 and 2016 leaving the building substantially damaged. Hartwoodhill Hospital, the sister facility, subsequently closed as well in February 2011. In November 2025, a large fire caused substantial damage to the hospital's former Nurses' Home structure.

In February 2020 it was reported that portions of Matt Reeves's The Batman were being filmed at the location, with the site dressed as Gotham Orphanage.
