= Single non-transferable vote =

Multi-winner, semi-proportional electoral system

Single non-transferable vote (SNTV) is a multi-winner electoral system in which each voter casts a single vote. Like first-past-the-post voting, SNTV uses basic plurality to allocate seats. Being semi-proportional, SNTV gives a chance for both small parties and large parties to be represented. Under SNTV, a single party seldom will take all seats in a city or district.

SNTV is a combination of multi-member districts and each voter casting just one vote. SNTV can be considered a variant of dot voting where each voter has only one point to assign. It can also be seen as a variant of limited voting where each elector has one vote, or as a simple version of single transferable vote where votes are not transferred. Unlike block voting or limited voting, where voters can cast two or more votes, under SNTV each voter casts just one.

SNTV retains many of the problems of first-past-the-post voting (first-preference plurality voting), such as high incidence of wasted votes. As a result it is sometimes viewed skeptically by social choice theorists. However, its relative simplicity and easy vote-counting makes the system particularly popular for small elections to offices such as city councils, particularly when compared to the more-intricate single transferable vote (STV) system, and has resulted in the method becoming commonly used for ordering open party lists.

== Voting ==
In any election, each voter casts one vote for one candidate in a multi-candidate race for multiple offices. Posts are filled by the candidates with more votes than the others (plurality voting). Thus, in a three-seat constituency, the three candidates receiving the largest numbers of votes would win office, even if none of them take a majority of the votes.

SNTV, like single transferable vote, can be used with non-partisan ballots, in election contests where there are no parties.

=== Example ===
Three seats are to be filled among five candidates: A, B, C, D and E fielded by 3 parties X, Y and Z.

Votes	Candidate	Party
2,718	E	Y
1,999	D	Z
1,996	C	Z
1,804	B	Y
819	A	X

E, D and C are the winning candidates. Thus, Party Z gets two seats and Party Y gets one seat. No one party took all the seats as might have been the result under first past the post or plurality block voting.

But counting the votes by party gives these vote tallies:

Party	Votes	Percent	Seats
Y	4,522	48	1
Z	3,995	43	2
X	819	9	0

Party Y has more votes than Party Z, but receives fewer seats because of an inefficient spread of votes across the candidates. If Party Y's two candidates had had more equal vote tallies, it would have won two seats and Party Z only one. Or if Party Z's candidates had received less equal vote tallies, Party Y would have won two seats even if its candidates were not equally popular. (There is more chance in SNTV than a more orderly system of PR, such as list PR or STV.)

If either party had risked trying to win all three seats, causing more vote splitting among supporters of Parties Y and Z, then A of Party X might have won a seat and either party Y or Z would then have taken one fewer seat.

Given $n$ candidates to be elected, Candidate A can guarantee success by receiving one more than $\frac{1}{n+1}$ of the votes (the Droop quota), because $n$+1 other candidates cannot each receive more than Candidate A (too many would not pass Droop quota)

To determine the successful candidates, candidates' vote tallies are compared with the vote tallies of others, not with a theoretical threshold or quota. In the 2020 Vanuatuan general election, using SNTV, as few as 5 percent of the vote was enough to be elected in a seven-seat district, where about 13 percent is Droop quota.

=== SNTV compared to block voting and limited voting ===
For example, 10,000 voters vote to elect three members. Cumulative voting is not used so each voter may not cast more than one vote for a single candidate.

- Under block voting, each voter may cast up to 3 votes in the 3-seat district
- Under limited voting, each voter may cast 1 or 2 votes in the 3-seat district
- Under the single non-transferable vote, each voter may cast 1 vote in the 3-seat district

Party A has about 35% support among the electorate (with one particularly well-liked candidate). Party B has around 25% support (with two well-liked candidates). The remaining voters primarily support independent candidates, but mostly lean towards party B if they have to choose between the two parties. Vote percentage under block and limited voting is the percentage of voters who voted for the candidate, not percentage of all votes cast.

Candidate	Party	Plurality block voting						Single non-transferable vote		
Candidate	Party	Plurality block voting			Limited voting			Single non-transferable vote		
Candidate	Party	Votes	%	Elected?	Votes	%	Elected?	Votes	%	Elected?
Candidate A1	Party A	3700	37%	Yes	3200	32%	Yes	2000	20%	Yes
Candidate A2	Party A	3600	36%	Yes	1600	16%	Yes	900	9%	
Candidate A3	Party A	3555	36%	Yes	1400	14%		700	7%	
Candidate B1	Party B	2600	26%		1950	20%	Yes	1100	11%	Yes
Candidate B2	Party B	2500	25%		1750	18%		950	9.5%	Yes
Candidate B3	Party B	2350	24%		1025	10%		600	6%	
Candidate I1	Independent	1100	11%		1100	11%		850	8.5%	
Candidate I2	Independent	950	9.5%		900	9%		750	7.5%	
Candidate I3	Independent	850	8.5%		800	8.5%		600	6%	
Candidate I4	Independent	800	8%		750	7.5%		550	5.5%	
Candidate I5	Independent	750	7.5%		700	7%		500	5%	
Candidate I6	Independent	600	6%		650	6.5%		450	4.5%	
TOTAL votes cast		22405			17225			10000		
TOTAL possible votes		30000			20000			10000		
Voters		10000			10000			10000	100%	

- The three most-popular candidates according to voters' first preferences are elected, regardless of party affiliation.
- Under the single non-transferable vote (like in block voting and limited voting) the number of seats are sometimes not proportionately allocated. Over-optimism (running too many candidates) and vote splitting is punished. But each popular party that runs one candidate is assured of success to that degree anyway. In this case, even though the most-popular party ran three and risked vote splitting, it did elect one member.
- Single non-transferable vote described here is not a type of approval voting.
- Under block voting, the three candidates of the most-popular party are elected if its supporters vote along party lines. In this case a party with only 35 percent support took all the seats.
- Under limited voting, it is most likely that the party with a plurality takes two seats (or the same number of seats as the number of votes each voter has), and another less-popular party receives the remaining seat(s).
- STV (not shown here) would see each party take its due share of seats if voters mark their preferences along party lines. Thus Party A and Party B would take one seat for sure, with the third seat going to Party B due to it being the choice of supporters of the Independents if it came to choice of those two main parties. The three most-popular candidates according to vote tally are elected, regardless of party affiliation, but not necessarily in accordance with first preferences.

== Non-proportionality ==
SNTV increases political fragmentation and representation of small parties compared to first-past-the-post voting, that is, it produces mixed representation of large and small parties where no party takes all the seats. But not having transfers, SNTV sees more votes wasted than under STV due to votes being placed on un-electable candidate or due to surpluses received by successful candidate over and above the quota used in STV elections that are not able to be transferred under SNTV. In 2007 Scottish local authority elections, only 73 out of 1222 members were not in winning position in the first round, so only 73 owed their wins to vote transfers. (But that is not to say that first past the post or block voting would have produced the same winners. In each district, under SNTV multiple parties elected representatives, not the likely result under those two non-proportional systems.)

Representation elected under SNTV is more proportional when political parties have accurate information about their relative levels of electoral support, and nominate candidates in accordance with their respective levels of electoral support or when all parties suffer from poor information of that sort. Knowing the share of the votes a party will take allows it to avoid vote waste due to lessening the chance of vote splitting and inefficient placement of party support. Under 'perfect' strategic voting and strategic nomination, SNTV would be equivalent to the D'Hondt (Jefferson) method of proportional representation.

The number of wasted votes in an SNTV election is generally lower than in first past the post elections.

SNTV generally does not achieve equal seats-to-votes ratios, because it is difficult to accurately judge their strength when deciding how many candidates to field (strategic nomination) and difficult to direct party supporters as a whole to spread their votes efficiently. If they field too many, supporters' votes might be split across too many candidates. The party votes might spread their vote numbers to the point where all of a party's candidates lose to a less thinly spread opposing party. If a party fields too few candidates, they might elect all their candidates but not win seats proportional to their level of support, and the winning candidates would have more support than necessary and thus wasting votes.

The risks of poor strategic nomination are not equal for parties of various strengths. A large party would have much more to lose from the split vote effect than to gain from avoiding the wasted vote effect, and so would likely decide to err on the side of fielding fewer candidates (but probably not less than their existing number of seats). A small party with little representation would be more risk-tolerant and err on the side of too many candidates, hoping to gain as many seats as possible, perhaps even winning more than its proportion of the electorate if they can edge out candidates from larger parties with just a few votes. As well, a small party running just one candidate would not suffer from vote spitting, while a larger party running four or more may suffer from that.

SNTV electoral systems typically produce more proportional electoral outcomes as the size of the electoral districts (number of seats in each constituency) increases.

== Strategic voting ==
Strategic voting in a single non-transferable vote system is frequent. Casting only one vote, a rational voter wanting to maximize the number of seats captured by his party should vote for a candidate of the party that has a chance of winning, but one that will not win by too great a margin and thus take votes away from party colleagues. This creates opportunities for strategic nominations, with parties nominating candidates similar to their opponents' candidates in order to split the vote. Like all multiple-winner selections, parties find it advantageous to run a range of candidates in SNTV elections. Having candidates of both genders, two or more ethnic or language groups, and different home areas and socio-economic levels may yield better returns. But due to potential adverse results of vote splitting, the size of a party's slate in a district may need to be carefully assessed.

SNTV has been measured through the lens of such concepts as decision-theoretic analysis. Professor Gary W. Cox, an expert on SNTV, has studied this system's use in Japan. Cox has an explanation of real-world data finding the, "two systems [plurality and semi-proportional] are alike in their strategic voting equilibria." His research found that voters use the information offered in campaigns (polls, reporting, fundraising totals, endorsements, etc.), to rationally decide who the most viable candidates are and then vote for them.

SNTV can result in complicated intra-party dynamics because in a SNTV system, a candidate runs against candidates from their own party as well as against candidates from the other party. SNTV elections are not zero-sum contests. Just because one particular candidate is elected does not mean that another specific candidate will not be. They both can be elected.

Because voters cast vote directly for candidates, an individual candidate may be so popular that they draw votes away from other allied candidates, SNTV may encourage legislators to join factions that consist of patron-client relationships in which a powerful legislator/candidate can try to apportion votes to allied candidates by instructing different voters to vote in certain ways.

In addition, parties may do if their supporters evenly distribute their votes among the party's candidates. Historically, in Taiwan, the Kuomintang did this by sending members a letter telling them which candidate to vote for. With the Democratic Progressive Party, vote sharing is done informally, as members of a family or small group will coordinate their votes. The New Party had a surprisingly effective system by asking party supporters to vote for the candidate whose identification number corresponded to their birthdate. This led to all parties adopting a method of vote allocation for the 2004 ROC legislative elections.

== History ==
Single Non-transferable Voting was first proposed clearly by Saint-Just in 1793, in a proposal to the French National Convention. He proposed having the whole country of France as one multi-seat district; but the idea was not adopted at that time.

Japan was the first country to adopt SNTV for election of government members a hundred years after Saint-Just's proposal. In 1880s Japan adopted SNTV for provincial politicians and in 1900 for national politicians.

== Usage ==
SNTV is used for elections in Puerto Rico, Kuwait, Indonesia, Japan, Taiwan, Thailand, Libya, Iraq, Hong Kong and Vanuatu.

=== As a candidate-based method ===
==== Puerto Rico ====
In Puerto Rico, SNTV is known as at-large representation ("representación por acumulación" in Spanish), SNTV is used to elect the 11 at-large members in each of the House of Representatives and the Senate. Under at-large representation, political parties vary the ballot order of their candidates across electoral divisions, in order to ensure each candidate has a roughly equal chance of success. Since most voters choose the candidates placed at the top of their party lists on their ballots, at-large candidates from the same party usually obtain approximately equal vote totals. When the party's candidates are equally supported, the most-popular party is often able to take six seats of the 11.

The two major Puerto Rican political parties, the Popular Democratic Party and the New Progressive Party, usually each run six candidates for the 11 at-large members in each of the House of Representatives and the Senate, while the much smaller Puerto Rican Independence Party runs a single-candidate slate for the at-large members in the Senate and the House of Representatives. The SNTV-elected members are a small part of the chambers compared to the members elected in the sixteen Senate districts, elected by block voting, and the forty House districts, elected by first-past-the-post voting.

==== Japan, South Korea and Taiwan ====
SNTV was once used to elect the legislatures of Japan, South Korea and the Republic of China (Taiwan), but its use has been discontinued for the most part. It is still used in Japan for some seats in the House of Councillors (Sangi-in), prefectural assemblies and municipal assemblies.

In Taiwan it is used for the six aboriginal seats in the Legislative Yuan (national legislature), as well as local assemblies. The party structure there was complicated by the fact that while members of the Legislative Yuan were elected by SNTV, executive positions were (and still are) elected by a first past the post. This created a party system in which smaller factionalized parties, which SNTV promotes, have formed two large coalitions that resembles the two party system which first past the post rewards. Starting with the 2008 legislative elections, SNTV was discarded in favor of a mixed single member district (SMD) with proportional representation based on national party votes, similar to Japan. This system was a legacy of its colonial rule inherited from the Meiji Constitution.

==== Hong Kong ====
From 1997 to 2016, the electoral system for up to half of the seats of the Legislative Council of the territory was nominally a party-list proportional representation system with Hare quota. In practice, political parties fielded multiple lists in the same constituency. For example, the Democratic Party fielded three separate lists in the eight-seat New Territories West constituency in the 2008 election, aiming to win three seats (they won two). Split list or split tickets is done in order to win more seats with fewer votes, since the first candidate on each list would require less than the Hare quota to get a seat. Supporters are asked to split their votes among the lists of the same party, usually along geographical location of residence. In the 2012 and 2016 elections, no candidate list won more than one seat in any of the six PR constituencies which returned a total of 40 seats, rendering the result effectively the same as SNTV.

In the 2021 Hong Kong electoral reform, the Standing Committee of the National People's Congress instituted SNTV in its amendment to Annex 2 of the Basic Law on 30 March 2021. 20 seats of the Legislative Council are returned by geographical constituencies (GC) through single non-transferable vote with a district magnitude of 2. Effect of the district size of 2 under SNTV system in Hong Kong have been compared to that of the binomial voting system.

==== Libya ====
In accordance with its post-Gaddafi electoral law, Libya in 2012 elected 80 members of its 200-seat General National Congress using single non-transferable vote. Some commentators cited the system as a factor in the subsequent return to civil war in 2014.

==== Jordan ====
SNTV was used in Jordan from 1993 to 2016. SNTV became the official electoral system for legislature elections in Jordan in 1993, the second election since the country's return to an elected parliament in 1989. The 1993 electoral reform introduced SNTV as the "one-man, one-vote", which was argued to be a more egalitarian alternative to the former "block vote" (or Multiple non-transferable vote) where constituents could cast as many votes as there were seats in their constituency. (Under SNTV, each voter cast just one.) The Jordanian opposition parties were heavily critical of the voting reform as it significantly hurt their electoral results. The Islamic Action Front was at the forefront of this criticism, boycotting 4 of the 6 elections held under this system. The last election held purely under this system was in 2010, whose parliament was dissolved after the Arab Spring protests in Jordan and a new election was held in 2013 using both SNTV and a national closed list with a proportional system. SNTV was completely abolished after the 2016 electoral reform where it was replaced with open list PR (in 23 constituencies of between three and nine seats each) plus 15 seats reserved for women.

==== Kuwait ====
Kuwait has used SNTV to elect the members of its National Assembly (Majles al-Umma) in five 10-member districts, starting with the 2012 election.

==== Vanuatu ====
Since independence from Britain and France in 1980, Vanuatu has used SNTV to elect most of the members of its Parliament. Currently, other than eight members elected in single-member constituencies, the 52 members of Parliament are elected in ten multi-member constituencies (of between two and seven seats) by single non-transferable vote. The last election this was done was the 2025 Vanuatuan general election.

Chile uses elements of SNTV in its open-list PR system.

== See also ==
- Single transferable vote
- Plurality-at-large voting (multiple non-transferable vote (MNTV))
- Runoff voting
- Plurality block voting
