= Matrix vote =

Voting procedure

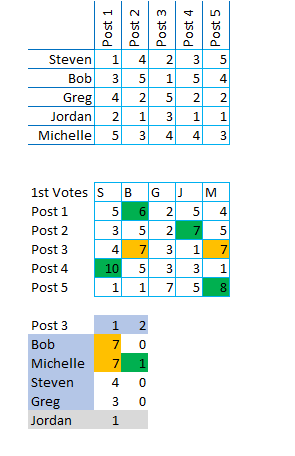
Sample matrix vote

The matrix vote is a voting procedure which can be used when one group of people wishes to elect a smaller number of persons, each of whom is to have a different assignment. Examples of its use are:

1. when an association elects its executive committee; and
2. when a parliament elects its all-party power-sharing coalition government.

Consider the situation in which a parliament elects a government of ten ministers.

- The ballot paper is tabular, a matrix, ten by ten: on one axis are listed the ten ministerial posts to be elected, and on the other axis are the ten preferences.
- Each MP then casts one vote (of a maximum) of ten preferences, naming the ten ministers in her order of preference, and saying at the same time in which ministerial post she wishes each of her nominees to serve. A full ballot will contain one name in each column, and one name in each row: that is, she identifies, in her order of preference, ten nominees, one for each of the ten ministerial posts.
- The count is in two stages: a Quota Borda system (QBS) is used to identify the ten most popular candidates; and then a Modified Borda Count determines which of these successful candidates will serve in which ministry.

The matrix vote is proportional. It is ideally suited, therefore, to the formation of power-sharing governments, especially in post-conflict scenarios, and not least because it works without any resort to party or sectarian labels.
