= Scab =

Scab may refer to:

== Biology ==
- Scab, a hard coating on the skin formed during the wound healing reconstruction phase
- scAb, single-chain antibody fragment

=== Infections and infestations ===
- Apple scab, an apple tree (genus Malus) fungal disease caused by Venturia inaequalis
- Black scab, a potato fungal disease caused by Synchytrium endobioticum
- Common scab, a plant bacterial disease caused by Streptomyces species
- Fusarium head blight, a fungal disease of plants, e.g., grain crops (especially wheat and oats), golf course grass, caused by the several species of Fusarium
- Pear scab, a pear fungal disease caused by Venturia pirina or Fusicladium pyrorum
- Poinsettia scab, a spot anthracnose disease caused by Sphaceloma poinsettiae
- Powdery scab, a disease of the skin of potatoes caused by the protozoa Spongospora subterranea
- Sheep scab, a skin disease of sheep caused by the mite Psoroptes ovis

== Labor ==
- Scab, a pejorative term for a strikebreaker, a person who works despite strike action or against the will of other employees

== Other uses ==
- South Coast Air Basin, in California, US
- Johnny Dole & The Scabs, one of the first punk rock bands in Australia
- "Scab" (Juliet Bravo), a 1985 television episode

== See also ==
- Scabs (disambiguation)
- Channeled Scablands, an eroded landscape formed by Missoula Floods in the U.S. state of Washington
- Scabies, a skin disease caused by the mite Sarcoptes scabiei
- U.S. Wheat and Barley Scab Initiative, a joint government and academic program to develop control measures to minimize the threat of Fusarium head blight (scab) in the United States
