= Quota Borda system =

Voting system

The quota Borda system or quota preference score is a voting system that was devised by the British philosopher Michael Dummett and first published in 1984 in his book, Voting Procedures, and again in his Principles of Electoral Reform.

If proportionality is required in a Borda count election, a quota element should be included into the counting procedure, which works best in multi-member constituencies of either 4 or 6 members. The threshold used is the Droop quota; in a single-seat constituency, the quota is an absolute majority, i.e., more than half of the valid vote; in a 2-seat constituency, it is the smallest number more than a third; in a 3-seat, it's the smallest number more than one fourth; and in a 4-seat constituency, it is the smallest number greater than one fifth of the valid vote.

The four-seat selection goes as follows:

1. Any candidate gaining a quota of 1st preferences is elected.
2. Any pair of candidates gaining 2 quotas is elected. (A pair of candidates, Ms J and Mr M, say, gains 2 quotas when that number of voters vote either 'J-1, M-2' or 'M-1, J-2'.) If seats still remain to be filled, then, ignoring all those candidates who have already been elected;
3. Any pair of candidates gaining 1 quota gains 1 seat, and the seat is given to the candidate of that pair who has the higher Modified Borda Count score.
4. Any seats still remaining are given to those candidates with the highest Modified Borda Count scores.

== See also ==
- Borda count
- Matrix vote
