= Oklahoma primary electoral system =

Former, unconstitutional, voting system

The Oklahoma primary electoral system was a voting system used to elect one winner from a pool of candidates using preferential voting. Voters rank candidates in order of preference, and their votes are initially allocated to their first-choice candidate. If, after this initial count, no candidate has a majority of votes cast, a mathematical formula comes into play. The system was used for primary elections in Oklahoma when it was adopted in 1925 until it was ruled unconstitutional by the Supreme Court of Oklahoma in 1926.

== Method ==
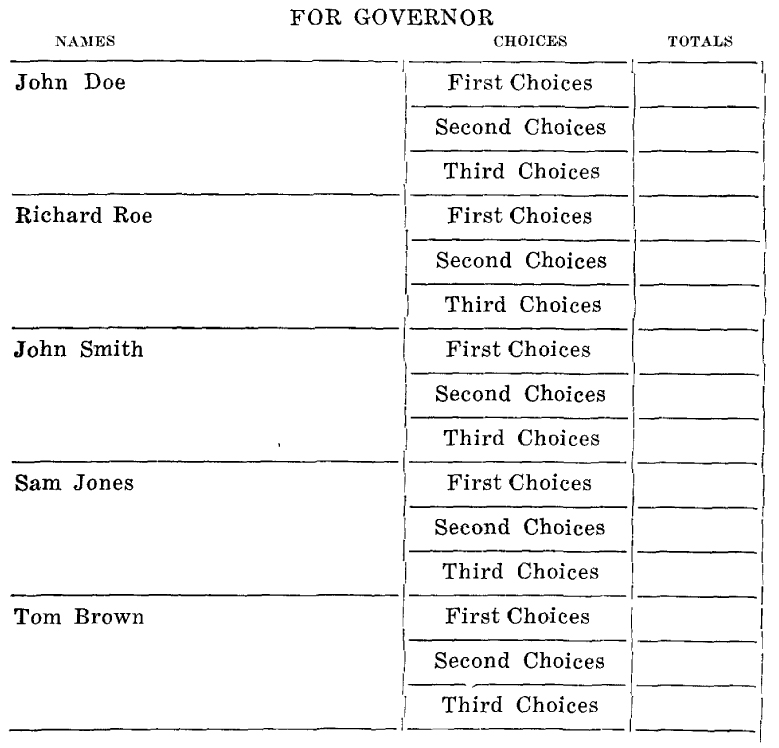
The prescribed table format in which the results of a vote held using this system should be presented, according to a now-repealed Oklahoma state law.

The system is a hybrid between Dowdall voting and Bucklin voting. Voters rank candidates in order of preference. Like in Bucklin voting, voting proceeds in rounds, where the first candidate to reach a majority wins. However, unlike in Bucklin, and like in Dowdall, a second-preference vote is worth half as many points as a first-preference vote; a third-preference is worth a third of a point; and so on. The first candidate whose point totals exceed half the number of voters is declared winner.

As actually implemented in Oklahoma, the system required voters to rank half of all candidates.

=== Worked example ===
Election results: 51 votes cast
| Candidate | Preference | Votes |
|---|---|---|
| Alice | First choices | 21 |
| Alice | Second choices | 8 (25) |
| Alice | Third choices | 7 [27 1/3] |
| Bob | First choices | 9 |
| Bob | Second choices | 10 (14) |
| Bob | Third choices | 5 [15 2/3] |
| Carol | First choices | 17 |
| Carol | Second choices | 16 (25) |
| Carol | Third choices | 4 [26 1/3] |
| Dave | First choices | 20 |
| Dave | Second choices | 10 (25) |
| Dave | Third choices | 26 [33 2/3] |
| Emma | First choices | 18 |
| Emma | Second choices | 7 (21.5) |
| Emma | Third choices | 9 [24 1/2] |

In the above example, no candidate has 25.5 points, so we add the second-preference votes: each person's number of second-preference votes is divided by two and added onto their number of first-preference votes. This new total is shown in parentheses.

None of these totals exceeds the majority figure of 26 either, so the third-preference votes are now factored in. Each candidates number of third-preference votes is divided by three and added on, shown in square brackets. At this stage, Alice, Carol, and Dave all have totals in excess of 26, but Dave's total is the highest, so he is the winner despite being ranked first by fewer people than was Alice.

== Adoption ==
The nomination for U.S. Senate of impeached former Governor Jack C. Walton is said to have "frightened" the state "into a system of preferential voting as an escape from minority nominations." In his Senate nomination, Walton received only "an extremely small per cent of the total votes cast," yet was still selected as the Democratic Party candidate, and this perceived injustice led to the Oklahoma Legislature resolving to adopt a different electoral system. However, it was not until the final day of debate on the law that the workings of the system chosen were agreed upon.

The decision to require voters to rank their preferences, which contrasted with most other states' procedures merely giving people the option of doing so (for that matter, only eight states used preferential voting at all), was an attempt to balance the competing concerns of preventing bullet voting (people deciding to list only their first choice) and of not forcing people to give any vote to candidates they found unacceptable. The Oklahoma Senate initially wanted to give second and third preferences equal weight, but the bill was eventually amended to weight them one-half and one-third respectively, it having been decided that this was "the more equitable practice."

== Reaction ==
The initial adoption of what was a highly unusual electoral system caused significant comment in the media and in academia. The law was described as "the most interesting and important primary legislation of the year" by the American Political Science Review, which identified two particular features as particularly intriguing: firstly, the requirement that voters rank a certain number of candidates, and secondly, the "improvement" of giving lower-preference votes less weight: "Here, then, appears to be something new under the sun—compulsory preferential voting for all who take the trouble to come out to the primary!" However, the requirement to rank candidates was also described as "obnoxious" and unfair to people who found only one candidate acceptable.

== Voiding ==
In 1926, the Oklahoma Supreme Court declared the 1925 law "null and void" and ruled that it was unconstitutional to "make it mandatory upon the voter to express a second choice when three or more candidates are running for a given office and a second and third choice when more than four candidates are running for a given office in order to have his vote counted" since such a principle could not "be harmonized with the constitutional guaranties that no power [should] ever interfere to prevent the free exercise of the right of suffrage." A writ was issued banning elections from being held under the system. Subsequently, Oklahoma's brief stint of preferential voting was analysed as having been "unsatisfactory."

== See also ==
- Bucklin voting
- Borda count
- Ranked voting systems
- Primary election
