= Borda count =

Point-based ranked voting system

The Borda method or order of merit is a positional voting rule that gives a candidate a number of points equal to the number of candidates ranked below them: the lowest-ranked candidate (the candidate least favoured by the voter) gets 0 points, the second-lowest gets 1 point, and so on. The points on all the ballots are calculated, and the candidate with the most points wins.

The Borda count has been independently reinvented several times, with the first recorded proposal in 1435 being by Nicholas of Cusa (see History below), but is named after the 18th-century French mathematician and naval engineer Jean-Charles de Borda, who re-devised the system in 1770.

The Borda count is well-known in social choice theory both for its pleasant theoretical properties and its ease of manipulation. In the absence of strategic voting and strategic nomination, the Borda count tends to elect broadly-acceptable options or candidates (rather than consistently following the preferences of a majority); when both voting and nomination patterns are completely random, the Borda count generally has an exceptionally high social utility efficiency. However, the method is highly vulnerable to spoiler effects when there are clusters of similar candidates; because the effects of more candidates on the election are unbounded, it is possible for any political party to win an election by running enough clones. Common implementations of equal-rank or truncated ballots can also incentivize extreme burial when voters are strategic, which allows deeply unpopular dark horse candidates to win by avoiding any attention. This problem arises because under the Borda count, a marked lesser preference may cause a voter's first preference to fail election. Under Borda, lesser preferences are given less weight than higher preferences so this problem is less severe than under the Bucklin system, but it still exists.

The traditional Borda method is currently used to elect two ethnic minority members of the National Assembly of Slovenia, and in modified forms to determine which candidates are elected to the party list seats in Icelandic parliamentary elections. A variant known as the Dowdall system is used to elect members of the Parliament of Nauru. Until the early 1970s, another variant was used in Finland to select individual candidates within party lists. From 1979 until 2002 the method was used to select presidential election candidates in Kiribati. It is also widely used throughout the world by various private organizations and competitions.

The quota Borda system is a proportional multiwinner variant.

== Voting and counting ==
=== Ballot ===

The Borda count is a ranked voting system: the voter ranks the list of candidates in order of preference. So, for example, the voter gives a 1 to their most preferred candidate, a 2 to their second most preferred, and so on. In this respect, it is similar to other ranked voting systems such as instant-runoff voting, the single transferable vote or Condorcet methods. The integer-valued ranks for evaluating the candidates were justified by Laplace, who used a probabilistic model based on the law of large numbers.

The Borda count is classified as a positional voting system, that is, all preferences are counted but at different values. The other commonly used positional system is plurality voting, which only assigns one point to the top candidate.

Each candidate is assigned a number of points from each ballot equal to the number of candidates to whom he or she is preferred.

In Borda's original 1784 paper, he assigned 1 point to the lowest-ranked candidate, 2 to the second-lowest, and so on, so that with n candidates, the highest-ranked candidate on a ballot received n points. He noted that if every voter ranks all candidates, it does not matter how many points are assigned to the lowest-ranked candidate.

In modern usage, the lowest-ranked typically receives 0 points, the second-lowest 1 point, and so on, so that with n candidates, each one receives n – 1 points for a first preference. The winner is the candidate with the largest total number of points. For example, in a four-candidate election, the number of points assigned for the preferences expressed by a voter on a single ballot paper might be:

Ranking	Candidate	Formula	Points
1st	Andrew	n − 1	3
2nd	Brian	n − 2	2
3rd	Catherine	n − 3	1
4th	David	n − 4	0

Suppose that there are 3 voters, U, V and W, of whom U and V rank the candidates in the order A-B-C-D while W ranks them B-C-D-A.

Candidate	U Points	V Points	W points	Total
Andrew	3	3	0	6
Brian	2	2	3	7
Catherine	1	1	2	4
David	0	0	1	1

Thus Brian is elected.

A longer example, based on a fictitious election for Tennessee state capital, is shown below.

== Properties ==
=== Elections as estimation procedures ===
Condorcet looked at an election as an attempt to combine estimators. Suppose that each candidate has a figure of merit and that each voter has a noisy estimate of the value of each candidate. The ballot paper allows the voter to rank the candidates in order of estimated merit. The aim of the election is to produce a combined estimate of the best candidate. Such an estimator can be more reliable than any of its individual components.

Peyton Young showed that the Borda count gives an approximately maximum likelihood estimator of the best candidate. His theorem assumes that errors are independent, in other words, that if a voter rates a particular candidate highly, then there is no reason to expect her to rate "similar" candidates highly. If this property is absent – if the voter gives correlated rankings to candidates with shared attributes – then the maximum likelihood property is lost, and the Borda count is highly subject to nomination effects: a candidate is more likely to be elected if there are similar candidates on the ballot.

=== Effect of irrelevant candidates ===
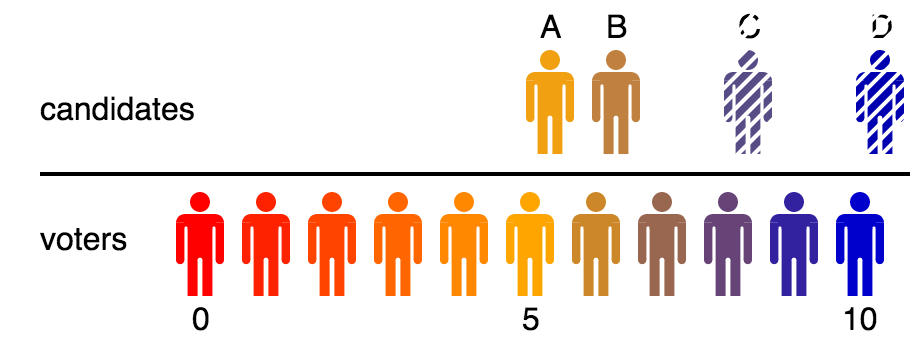
An election under the Borda count

The Borda count is particularly susceptible to distortion through the presence of candidates who do not themselves come into consideration, even when the voters lie along a spectrum. Voting systems which satisfy the Condorcet criterion are protected against this weakness since they automatically also satisfy the median voter theorem, which says that the winner of an election will be the candidate preferred by the median voter regardless of which other candidates stand.

Suppose that there are 11 voters whose positions along the spectrum can be written 0, 1, ..., 10, and suppose that there are 2 candidates, Andrew and Brian, whose positions are as shown:

Candidate	A	B
Position	5 1/4	6 1/4

The median voter Marlene is at position 5, and both candidates are to her right, so we would expect A to be elected. We can verify this for the Borda system by constructing a table to illustrate the count. The main part of the table shows the voters who prefer the first to the second candidate, as given by the row and column headings, while the additional column to the right gives the scores for the first candidate.

2nd 1st	A	B	score
A	—	0–5	6
B	6–10	—	5

A is indeed elected.

But now suppose that two additional candidates, further to the right, enter the election.

Candidate	A	B	C	D
Position	5 1/4	6 1/4	8 1/4	10 1/4

The counting table expands as follows:

2nd 1st	A	B	C	D	score
A	—	0–5	0–6	0–7	21
B	6–10	—	0–7	0–8	22
C	7–10	8–10	—	0–9	17
D	8–10	9–10	10	—	6

The entry of two dummy candidates allows B to win the election. Similar examples led the Marquis de Condorcet to argue that the Borda count is "bound to lead to error" because it "relies on irrelevant factors to form its judgments".

=== Other properties ===
There are a number of formalised voting system criteria whose results are summarised in the following table.

Comparison of single-winner voting systems
Criterion Method	Majority winner	Majority loser	Mutual majority	Condorcet winner (Note: Condorcet's criterion is incompatible with the consistency, independence of irrelevant alternatives, participation, later-no-harm, later-no-help, and sincere favorite criteria.)	Condorcet loser	Pareto	Smith	Smith-IIA	IIA/LIIA	IPDA	Cloneproof	Monotone	Consistency	Participation	Reversal symmetry	Homogeneity	Later-no-harm	Later-no-help	Sincere favorite	Ballot type
Plurality	Yes	No	No	No	No	Yes	No	No	No		No	Yes	Yes	Yes	No	Yes	Yes	Yes	No	Single mark
Anti-plurality	No	Yes	No	No	No	No	No	No	No	No	No	Yes	Yes	Yes	No	Yes	No	No	Yes	Single mark
Two round system	Yes	Yes	No	No	Yes	Yes	No	No	No		No	No	No	No		Yes	Yes	Yes	No	Single mark
Instant-runoff	Yes	Yes	Yes	No	Yes	Yes	No	No	No		Yes	No	No	No	No	Yes	Yes	Yes	No	Ranking
Coombs	Yes	Yes	Yes	No	Yes		No	No	No	No	No	No	No	No		Yes	No	No	Yes	Ranking
Nanson	Yes	Yes	Yes	Yes	Yes		Yes	No	No	No	No	No	No	No	Yes		No	No	No	Ranking
Baldwin	Yes	Yes	Yes	Yes	Yes		Yes	No	No	No	No	No	No	No	No		No	No	No	Ranking
Tideman alternative	Yes	Yes	Yes	Yes	Yes		Yes	Yes	No		Yes	No	No	No	No		No	No	No	Ranking
Minimax	Yes	No	No	Yes (Note: A variant of Minimax that counts only pairwise opposition, not opposition minus support, fails the Condorcet criterion and meets later-no-harm.)	No	Yes	No	No	No	Yes	No	Yes	No	No	No	Yes	No	No	No	Ranking
Copeland	Yes	Yes	Yes	Yes	Yes	Yes	Yes	Yes	No	No	No	Yes	No	No			No	No	No	Ranking
Black	Yes	Yes	No	Yes	Yes	Yes	No	No	No	No	No	Yes	No	No	Yes	Yes	No	No	No	Ranking
Kemeny	Yes	Yes	Yes	Yes	Yes	Yes	Yes	Yes	LIIA	No	No	Yes	No	No	Yes	Yes	No	No	No	Ranking
Ranked pairs	Yes	Yes	Yes	Yes	Yes	Yes	Yes	Yes	LIIA	No	Yes	Yes	No	No (Note: In Highest median, Ranked Pairs, and Schulze voting, there is always a regret-free, semi-honest ballot for any voter, holding all other ballots constant and assuming they know enough about how others will vote. Under such circumstances, there is always at least one way for a voter to participate without grading any less-preferred candidate above any more-preferred one.)	Yes	Yes	No	No	No	Ranking
Schulze	Yes	Yes	Yes	Yes	Yes	Yes	Yes	Yes	No	No	Yes	Yes	No	No	Yes	Yes	No	No	No	Ranking
Borda	No	Yes	No	No	Yes	Yes	No	No	No	No	No	Yes	Yes	Yes	Yes	Yes	No	Yes	No	Ranking
Bucklin	Yes	Yes	Yes	No	No		No	No	No	No	No	Yes	No	No	No	Yes	No	Yes	No	Ranking
Dodgson	Yes	No	No	Yes	No		No	No	No		No	No	No	No	No	No	No	No	No	Ranking
Approval	Yes	No	No	No	No	Yes	No	Yes	Yes (Note: Approval voting, score voting, and majority judgment satisfy IIA if it is assumed that voters rate candidates independently using their own absolute scale. For this to hold, in some elections, some voters must use less than their full voting power despite having meaningful preferences among viable candidates.)	Yes	Yes	Yes	Yes	Yes	Yes	Yes	No	Yes	Yes	Approvals
Majority Judgment	No	No (Note: Majority Judgment may elect a candidate uniquely least-preferred by over half of voters, but it never elects the candidate uniquely bottom-rated by over half of voters.)	No (Note: Majority Judgment fails the mutual majority criterion, but satisfies the criterion if the majority ranks the mutually favored set above a given absolute grade and all others below that grade.)	No	No		No	Yes	Yes		Yes	Yes	No	No		Yes	No	Yes	Yes	Scores
Score	No	No	No	No	No		No	Yes	Yes		Yes	Yes	Yes	Yes	Yes	Yes	No	Yes	Yes	Scores
STAR	No	Yes	No	No	Yes		No	No	No	No	No	Yes	No	No	No		No	No	No	Scores
Quadratic	No	No	No	No	No		No	No	No		No	Yes	Yes	Yes			N/A	N/A	No	Credits
Random ballot (Note: A randomly chosen ballot determines the winner. It is the unique social choice rule that treats all voters equally while still being strategyproof in all situations.)	No	No	No	No	No	Yes	No	Yes	Yes	Yes	Yes	Yes		Yes	No	Yes	Yes	Yes	Yes	Single mark
Maximal lotteries	Yes	Yes	Yes	Yes	Yes	Yes	Yes		No		Yes	No	Yes	No	No					Ranking
Sortition (Note: Where a winner is randomly chosen from the candidates, sortition is included to demonstrate that even non-voting methods can pass some criteria.)	No	No	No	No	No	No	No	Yes	Yes	No	No	Yes	N/A	Yes	N/A	N/A	Yes	Yes	Yes	None
Table Notes																				

Simulations show that Borda has a high probability of choosing the Condorcet winner when one exists, in the absence of strategic voting and with ballots ranking all candidates.

== Equal ranks ==
Several different methods of handling tied ranks have been suggested. They can be illustrated using the 4-candidate election discussed previously.

Ranking	Candidate	Points
1st	Andrew	3
2nd	Brian	2
3rd	Catherine	1
4th	David	0

- Traditional Borda: In Borda's system as originally proposed, each tied candidate was given the minimum number of points. So if a voter marks Andrew as his or her first preference, Brian as his or her second, and leaves Catherine and David unranked, then Andrew will receive 3 points, Brian 2, and Catherine and David none. This is an example of what Narodytska and Walsh call "rounding up".
- Tournament Borda: each candidate receives half a point for every other candidate they are tied with, in addition to a whole point for every candidate they are strictly preferred to. In the example, suppose that a voter is indifferent between Andrew and Brian, preferring both to Catherine and Catherine to David. Then Andrew and Brian will each receive 2 1/2 points, Catherine will receive 1, and David none. This is referred to as "averaging" by Narodytska and Walsh.
- Modified Borda: again allows ties only at the end of a voter's ranking. It gives no points to unranked candidates, 1 point to the least preferred of the ranked candidates, etc. So if a voter ranks Andrew above Brian and leaves other candidates unranked, Andrew will receive 2 points, Brian will receive 1 point, and Catherine and David will receive none. This is equivalent to "rounding down". The most preferred candidate on a ballot paper will receive a different number of points depending on how many candidates were left unranked.

=== Effects on strategy ===
The modified Borda and tournament Borda methods, as well as methods of Borda that do not allow for equal rankings, are well-known for behaving disastrously in response to tactical voting, a reaction called a turkey election. The French Academy of Sciences (of which Borda was a member) experimented with Borda's system but abandoned it, in part because "the voters found how to manipulate the Borda rule". In response to the issue of strategic manipulation in the Borda count, M. de Borda said:

Mon scrutin n'est fait que pour d'honnêtes gens.
My scheme is intended for only honest men.

Despite its abandonment, the rounded-down Borda rule has a substantially less severe reaction to tactical voting than the traditional or tournament variants. Tactical voting consists of the relatively mild bullet voting, which only causes the race to behave like a cross between a plurality vote and an honest Borda count, rather than producing a potential turkey-election. In Slovenia, which uses this form of the rule, roughly 42% of voters rank a second preference.

=== Forced truncation ===
Some implementations of Borda voting require voters to truncate their ballots to a certain length:

- In Kiribati, the variant employed between 1979 and 2002 used a traditional Borda formula, but with voters ranking only four candidates, irrespective of how many were standing. This approach was abandoned with the passage of the Election of the Beretitenti (Amendment) Act 2002, which commenced on 18 October 2002.
- In Toastmasters International, speech contests are truncation-scored as 3, 2, 1 for the top-three ranked candidates. Ties are broken by having a special ballot that is ignored unless there is a tie.

== Multiple winners ==
The system invented by Borda was intended for use in elections with a single winner, but it is also possible to conduct a Borda count with more than one winner, by recognizing the desired number of candidates with the most points as the winners. In other words, if there are two seats to be filled, then the two candidates with most points win; in a three-seat election, the three candidates with most points, and so on. In Nauru, which uses the multi-seat variant of the Borda count, parliamentary constituencies of two and four seats are used.

The quota Borda system is a system of proportional representation in multi-seat constituencies that uses the Borda count. Chris Geller's STV-B uses vote count quotas to elect, but eliminates the candidate with the lowest Borda score; Geller-STV does not recalculate Borda scores after partial vote transfers, meaning partial-transfer of votes affects voting power for election but not for elimination.

== Related systems ==
The Nanson and Baldwin methods are Condorcet-consistent voting methods based on the Borda score. Both are run as series of elimination rounds analogous to instant-runoff voting. In the Nanson method, every candidate with less than the average Borda score is eliminated each round; in the Baldwin method, the candidate with lowest score is eliminated. Unlike the Borda count, Nanson and Baldwin are majoritarian Condorcet methods because a Condorcet winner always has a higher than average Borda score, and the Condorcet loser always has a lower than average Borda score. Neither method is monotonic.

== Potential for tactical manipulation ==
Borda counts are vulnerable to manipulation by both tactical voting and strategic nomination. The Dowdall system may be more resistant, based on observations in Kiribati using the modified Borda count versus Nauru using the Dowdall system, but little research has been done thus far on the Nauru system.

=== Tactical voting ===
Borda counts are unusually vulnerable to tactical voting, even compared to most other voting systems. Voters who vote tactically, rather than via their true preference, will be more influential; more alarmingly, if everyone starts voting tactically, the result tends to approach a large tie that will be decided semi-randomly. When a voter utilizes compromising, they insincerely raise the position of a second or third choice candidate over their first choice candidate, in order to help the second choice candidate to beat a candidate they like even less. When a voter utilizes burying, voters can help a more-preferred candidate by insincerely lowering the position of a less-preferred candidate on their ballot. Combining both these strategies can be powerful, especially as the number of candidates in an election increases. For example, if there are two candidates whom a voter considers to be the most likely to win, the voter can maximise his impact on the contest between these front runners by ranking the candidate whom he likes more in first place, and ranking the candidate whom he likes less in last place. If neither front runner is his sincere first or last choice, the voter is employing both the compromising and burying tactics at once; if enough voters employ such strategies, then the result will no longer reflect the sincere preferences of the electorate.

For an example of how potent tactical voting can be, suppose a trip is being planned by a group of 100 people on the East Coast of North America. They decide to use Borda count to vote on which city they will visit. The three candidates are New York City, Orlando, and Iqaluit. 48 people prefer Orlando / New York / Iqaluit; 44 people prefer New York / Orlando / Iqaluit; 4 people prefer Iqaluit / New York / Orlando; and 4 people prefer Iqaluit / Orlando / New York. If everyone votes their true preference, the result is:

1. Orlando: $(48 \times 2) + ((44+4) \times 1) {{=}} 144$
2. New York: $(44\times2) + ((48+4) \times 1) {{=}} 140$
3. Iqaluit: $((4+4)\times2) {{=}} 16$

If the New York voters realize that they are likely to lose and all agree to tactically change their stated preference to New York / Iqaluit / Orlando, burying Orlando, then this is enough to change the result in their favor:

1. New York: $(44\times2) + ((48+4) \times 1) {{=}} 140$
2. Orlando: $(48\times2) + (4 \times 1) {{=}} 100$
3. Iqaluit: $((4+4)\times2) + (44 \times 1) {{=}} 60$

In this example, only a few of the New York voters needed to change their preference to tip this result because it was so close – just five voters would have been sufficient had everyone else still voted their true preferences. However, if Orlando voters realize that the New York voters are planning on tactically voting, they too can tactically vote for Orlando / Iqaluit / New York. When all of the New York and all of the Orlando voters do this, however, there is a surprising new result:

1. Iqaluit: $((4+4)\times2) + ((48+44) \times 1) {{=}} 108$
2. Orlando: $(48\times2) + (4 \times 1) {{=}} 100$
3. New York: $(44\times2) + (4 \times 1) {{=}} 92$

The tactical voting has overcorrected, and now the clear last place option is a threat to win, with all three options extremely close. Tactical voting has entirely obscured the true preferences of the group into a large near-tie.

=== Strategic nomination ===
The Borda count is highly vulnerable to a form of strategic nomination called teaming or cloning. This means that when more candidates run with similar ideologies, the probability of one of those candidates winning increases. This is illustrated by the example 'Effect of irrelevant alternatives' above. Therefore, under the Borda count, it is to a faction's advantage to run as many candidates as it can. For example, even in a single-seat election, it would be to the advantage of a political party to stand as many candidates as possible in an election. In this respect, the Borda count differs from many other single-winner systems, such as the 'first past the post' plurality system, in which a political faction is disadvantaged by running too many candidates. Under systems such as plurality, 'splitting' a party's vote in this way can lead to the spoiler effect, which harms the chances of any of a faction's candidates being elected.

Strategic nomination is used in Nauru, according to MP Roland Kun, with factions running multiple "buffer candidates" who are not expected to win, to lower the tallies of their main competitors. However, the effect of this strategic nomination is greatly reduced by the use of a harmonic progression rather than a simple arithmetic progression. Because the harmonic series is unbounded, it is theoretically possible to elect any candidate (no matter how unpopular) by nominating enough clones. In practice, the number of clones required to do so would likely exceed the total population of Nauru.

== Example ==
Tennessee voting pattern

42% of voters	26% of voters	15% of voters	17% of voters
1. Memphis; 2. Nashville; 3. Chattanooga; 4. Knoxville	1. Nashville; 2. Chattanooga; 3. Knoxville; 4. Memphis	1. Chattanooga; 2. Knoxville; 3. Nashville; 4. Memphis	1. Knoxville; 2. Chattanooga; 3. Nashville; 4. Memphis

Suppose Tennessee is holding an election on the location of its capital. The population is split between four cities, and all the voters want the capital to be as close to them as possible. The options are:

- Memphis, large but far to the west
- Nashville, medium, near the center
- Chattanooga, small and in the east
- Knoxville, small and isolated

Thus voters are assumed to prefer candidates in order of proximity to their home town. We get the following point counts per 100 voters:

Voters Candidate	Memphis	Nashville	Knoxville	Chattanooga	Score
Memphis	42×3=126	0	0	0	126
Nashville	42×2 = 84	26×3 = 78	17×1 = 17	15×1 = 15	194
Knoxville	0	26×1 = 26	17×3 = 51	15×2 = 30	107
Chattanooga	42×1 = 42	26×2 = 52	17×2 = 34	15×3 = 45	173

Accordingly Nashville is elected.

=== Dowdall ===
Under Dowdall rules the table would be as follows

Voters Candidate	Memphis	Nashville	Knoxville	Chattanooga	Score
Memphis	42×1=42	26×1/4 = 6.5	17×1/4 = 4.25	15×1/4 = 3.75	56.5
Nashville	42×1/2 = 21	26×1 = 26	17×1/3 = 5.6667...	15×1/3 = 5	57.667...
Knoxville	42×1/4 = 10.5	26×1/3 = 8.333...	17×1 = 17	15×1/2 = 7.5	43.667...
Chattanooga	42×1/3 = 14	26×1/2 = 13	17×1/2 = 8.5	15×1 = 15	50.5

Just like normal Borda rules, Nashville would win.

== Current uses ==
=== Political uses ===
The Borda count is used for certain political elections in Slovenia and was used in the Micronesian nation of Kiribati before 2002. A similar rule is used in Nauru.

In Slovenia, the Borda count is used to elect two of the ninety members of the National Assembly: one member represents a constituency of ethnic Italians, the other a constituency of the Hungarian minority.

Members of the Parliament of Nauru are elected based on a variant of the Borda count that involves two departures from the normal practice:

1. multi-seat constituencies, of either two or four seats
2. a point-allocation formula that involves increasingly small fractions of points for each ranking, rather than whole points.

In Kiribati, the president (or Beretitenti) is elected by the plurality system, but (prior to 2002) a variant of the Borda count was used to select either three or four candidates to stand in the election. The constituency consisted of members of the legislature (Maneaba). Voters in the legislature ranked only four candidates, with all other candidates receiving zero points. Since at least 1991, tactical voting had been an important feature of the nominating process.

The Republic of Nauru became independent from Australia in 1968. Before independence, and for three years afterwards, Nauru used instant-runoff voting, importing the system from Australia, but since 1971, a variant of the Borda count has been used.

The modified Borda count has been used by the Green Party of Ireland to elect its chairperson.

The Borda count has been used for non-governmental purposes at certain peace conferences in Northern Ireland, where it has been used to help achieve consensus between participants including members of Sinn Féin, the Ulster Unionists, and the political wing of the UDA.

=== Other uses ===
The Borda count is used in elections by some educational institutions in the United States:

- University of Michigan
  - Central Student Government
  - Student Government of the College of Literature, Science and the Arts (LSASG)
- University of Missouri: officers of the Graduate-Professional Council
- University of California Los Angeles: officers of the Graduate Student Association
- Harvard University: members of the Undergraduate Council, as of 2018
- Southern Illinois University at Carbondale: officers of the Faculty Senate,
- Arizona State University: officers of the Department of Mathematics and Statistics assembly.
- Wheaton College, Massachusetts: faculty members of committees.
- College of William and Mary: members of the faculty personnel committee of the School of Business Administration (tie-breaker).

The Borda count is used in elections by some professional and technical societies:

- International Society for Cryobiology: Board of Governors.
- U.S. Wheat and Barley Scab Initiative: members of Research Area Committees.
- X.Org Foundation: Board of Directors.

The OpenGL Architecture Review Board uses the Borda count as one of the feature-selection methods.

The Borda count is used to determine winners for the World Champion of Public Speaking contest organized by Toastmasters International. Judges offer a ranking of their top three speakers, awarding them three points, two points, and one point, respectively. All unranked candidates receive zero points.

The modified Borda count is used to elect the President for the United States member committee of AIESEC.

The Eurovision Song Contest uses a heavily modified form of the Borda count, with a different distribution of points: only the top ten entries are considered in each ballot, the favorite entry receiving 12 points, the second-placed entry receiving 10 points, and the other eight entries getting points from 8 to 1. Although designed to favor a clear winner, it has produced very close races and even a tie.

The Borda count is used for wine trophy judging by the Australian Society of Viticulture and Oenology, and by the RoboCup autonomous robot soccer competition at the Center for Computing Technologies, in the University of Bremen in Germany.

The Finnish Associations Act lists three different modifications of the Borda count for holding a proportional election. All the modifications use fractions, as in Nauru. A Finnish association may choose to use other methods of election, as well.

==== Sports awards ====
The Borda count is a popular method for granting sports awards. American uses include:

- MLB Most Valuable Player Award (baseball)
- Heisman Trophy (college football)
- Ranking of NCAA college teams, including in the AP Poll and Coaches Poll

=== In information retrieval ===
The Borda count has been proposed as a rank aggregation method in information retrieval, in which documents are ranked according to multiple criteria and the resulting rankings are then combined into a composite ranking. In this method, the ranking criteria are treated as voters, and the aggregate ranking is the result of applying the Borda count to their "ballots".

=== Analogy with sporting tournaments ===
Sporting tournaments frequently seek to produce a ranking of competitors from pairwise matches, in each of which a single point is awarded for a win, half a point for a draw, and no points for a loss. (Sometimes the scores are doubled as 2/1/0.) This is analogous to a Borda count in which each preference expressed by a single voter between two candidates is equivalent to a sporting fixture; it is also analogous to Copeland's method supposing that the electorate's overall preference between two candidates takes the place of a sporting fixture. This scoring system was adopted for international chess around the middle of the nineteenth century and by the English Football League in 1888–1889.

== History ==
The Borda count is thought to have been developed independently at least four times:

- Ramon Llull (1232–1315/16) described the election of an abbess in the 1283 novel Blanquerna. The election process is equivalent to the second of Borda's two equivalent definitions of the Borda count.
- Nicholas of Cusa (1401–1464) in his "De Concordantia Catholica" (1433) provided the first description of the Borda count and argued unsuccessfully for its use in the election of the Holy Roman Emperor. Cusa is known to have read another of Llull's pamphlets but presents a different definition and appears either to have been unaware of the Blanquerna method or not to realized it was equivalent.
- Jean-Charles de Borda (1733–1799) devised the system as a fair way to elect members to the French Academy of Sciences in a paper presented to the Academy in 1784 and published as "Mémoire sur les élections au scrutin" in Histoire de l'Académie Royale des Sciences, Paris. (Note: The article appeared in the 1781 edition of the Histoire, and Borda himself asserted he had publicized these ideas as early as 1770, but 1784 appears to be the correct date of attribution. Brian, É, "Condorcet and Borda in 1784. Misfits and Documents", Electronic Journal for History of Probability and Statistics, Vol. 4, No. 1 (June 2008).) The Borda count was the sole method used for membership election to the Academy from 1795 until 1800, when it was supplemented by other methods at the urging of Napoleon.
- Charles L. Dodgson (Lewis Carroll, 1832–1898) proposed a version of the Borda count in "A discussion of the various methods of procedure in conducting elections" (1783) for a vote to assign a fellowship at Christ Church, Oxford. The fellows voted using the method, realized that there was a Condorcet winner who did not win (a violation of the Condorcet Criterion), rejected the results, and awarded the fellowship to the Condorcet winner. The next year, Dodgson proposed replacing his Borda count method with one similar to Copeland's method, then in 1876 proposed a hybrid of the two in "A method of taking votes on more than two issues". He appears to have been unaware of either Borda or Condorcet's work.

== See also ==
- Comparison of electoral systems
- Copeland's method
- Nanson's method
- Arrow's impossibility theorem
- Oklahoma primary electoral system
