= Strategic voting =

Choosing a candidate other than preferred to undercut a less desired one

Strategic or tactical voting is voting in consideration of possible ballots cast by other voters in order to maximize one's satisfaction with the election's results. Gibbard's theorem shows that no voting system has a single "always-best" strategy, i.e. one that always maximizes a voter's satisfaction with the result, regardless of other voters' ballots. This implies all voting systems can sometimes encourage voters to strategize. However, weaker guarantees can be shown under stronger conditions. Examples include one-dimensional preferences (where the median rule is strategyproof).

With large electoral districts, party list methods tend to be difficult to manipulate in the absence of an electoral threshold. However, biased apportionment methods can create opportunities for strategic voting, as can small electoral districts (e.g. those used most often with the single transferable vote). Proportional representation systems with small districts often involve large-scale vote management operations, which are common in countries using STV-PR such as Ireland.

== Common types of strategic voting ==
Some types of strategic voting described in the literature are:

Lesser-evil voting (sometimes called favorite betrayal)

A voter ranks or rates a candidate they dislike – a lesser evil – higher in the hope of getting them elected, thus preventing an even worse candidate from being elected. This type of strategic voting includes the first-past-the-post strategy of voting for the lesser of two evils among the top two frontrunners, as well as the more general favorite betrayal strategy.
A sufficiently strong compromising incentive, possibly strengthened by a strategic exit incentive, can lead to or reinforce two-party rule as voters will abandon minor-party candidates to support stronger major-party candidates. This effect is called Duverger's law.
Most affects: instant-runoff (RCV), two-round system, and (especially strong for) plurality.
Also affected: Borda, Score, approval voting.
Immune: Coombs' method, antiplurality, rated voting rules (e.g. score voting)

Burial
A voter ranks or rates a candidate lower in the hope of defeating them. For example, a voter may insincerely rank or rate a perceived strong candidate last in order to help their preferred candidate win.
Game theory arguments suggest that if burial incentive is sufficiently severe, a method may induce a race to the bottom. Each voter follows a strategy that, in isolation, helps their candidate win, but the result is that a candidate that nobody likes gets elected instead.
Most affects: Borda, antiplurality.
Also affected: Most Condorcet methods, with the exception of IRV-Condorcet hybrids.
Immune: Instant-runoff voting and plurality voting.

Turkey-raising (sometimes called pushover or pied-piper. Includes raiding.)
A voter gives a high rank to a weak (i.e. pushover or pied-piper) candidate, but not with the intent of getting them elected. Instead, the voter intends for the weak candidate to eliminate a strong alternative, who would otherwise keep the voter's preferred candidate from winning. Party raiding is a well-known example of such a strategy.
Most affects: Multi-round rules like instant-runoff, two-round, and primary elections.
Immune: Plurality and all commonly-used rated voting systems, including score voting and approval voting.
Compression (sometimes called leveling. Includes bullet voting, exaggeration, and truncation.)
Compression is a strategy where a voter refuses to disclose which of two candidates they honestly prefer (i.e. both candidates are given the same rating or ranking). Compression is unique in that it does not involve a rank reversal: in compression, a voter who prefers A to B does not claim to prefer B to A, only that they are indifferent between them.
This is most common in rated voting rules, where the optimal strategy often involves exaggerating the differences between candidates, assigning high-quality candidates a perfect score and low-quality candidates a score of zero.
Most affects: Rated voting.
Immune: Random ballot and methods that require strict rankings. Plurality voting is immune to truncation.

Abstention (sometimes called quorum-busting or a walkout)
Technically a form of strategic "non-voting", strategic abstention can be used in no-show paradoxes. It is an especially widespread kind of strategy in the case of quorums, where a group of voters can prevent a law from passing by ensuring the turnout is too low to meet a certain threshold.
Most affects: Common in case of participation quorums, resulting in quorum-busting.
Immune: Point-summing systems (i.e. score voting and positional voting) or Rawls's method and its converse.

== Frequency and susceptibility ==
Strategic voting is highly dependent on the voting method being used. A strategic vote which improves a voter's satisfaction under one method could have no effect or be outright self-defeating under another method. Gibbard's theorem shows that no deterministic single-winner voting method can be completely immune to strategy, but makes no claims about the severity of strategy or how often strategy succeeds. Later results show that some methods are more manipulable than others.

Michel Balinski and Rida Laraki, the inventors of the majority judgment method, performed an initial investigation of this question using a set of Monte Carlo simulated elections based on the results from a poll of the 2007 French presidential election which they had carried out using rated ballots. Comparing range voting, Borda count, plurality voting, approval voting with two different absolute approval thresholds, Condorcet voting, and majority judgment, they found that range voting had the highest (worst) strategic vulnerability, while their own method majority judgment had the lowest (best). Further investigation would be needed to be sure that this result remained true with different sets of candidates.

Party-list proportional methods typically show less strategic voting, although the existence of electoral thresholds can lead voters to vote strategically to avoid wasted votes.

== Mitigation ==
Switching from a method that is highly manipulable to one that is more resistant would help discourage widespread strategic voting, all else equal.

From a voting method, it is possible to design another voting method that attempts to strategize on behalf of the voter. Such methods are called declared strategy voting methods, and seek to improve a method's strategy resistance by moving the strategy into the method itself. DSV methods have been proposed for plurality voting, approval voting, and score voting.

== Coordination ==
The nature of strategic voting requires some level of coordination. Because it is a system of voting that assesses outcomes before casting one's vote, coordination towards the outcome is a prerequisite for strategic voting. There must be some kind of coordination device in order to vote strategically. Coordination devices, though not the only device, are typically opinion polls. For example, if there was two similarly appealing majority candidates and a minority candidate and voters were given the choice between the three, polls are imperative to coordinating votes for either majority candidate. Polls are then a tool used by voters to ensure that the minority candidate does not obtain office, which would be adverse to Duverger's law.

Coordination may also arise through social influence, affected from observing others' voting behavior. Computational models of strategic voting suggest that repeated interaction and imitation within social networking can cause particular voting strategies to spread among voters. The process may contribute either to greater electoral consensus or to persistent divisions between groups of voters.

Tactical voting may occur in isolation or as part of an organized campaign. In the former situation, electors make their own judgement as to the most effective way to (typically) prevent the election of a specific candidate or party. In the latter, one or more parties or groups encourage their supporters to vote tactically in an effort to influence the outcome.

The form that coordinated tactical voting takes depends largely on the electoral system of the polity. For example, vote thresholds in a proportional representation electoral system are found to prompt voters to coordinate their votes. For example, in the 2018 Swedish election, thresholds led voters who identified with a small party to consider the outcomes of their votes on the system of government as well as the other parties' outcomes. The voting history of the polity also influences coordination efforts: in proportional representation systems with little voting history, voters tend to vote more sincerely than engage in strategic voting due to the unknown nature of what party will be most viable.

Organized tactical voting in which a political party mounts a campaign calling on its supporters not to vote for their own favored candidates, but for those of a party which it perceives as more likely to defeat a common opponent, is less common. An example is the 1906 United Kingdom general election, where the Liberals (incidentally, the predecessors of the Liberal Democrats from the previous example) and the then-insurgent Labour Party (founded in 1900) agreed on the Gladstone-MacDonald pact, under which certain Liberal candidates would stand aside in favor of Labour ones, again to ensure that the Conservative candidates would not win on the basis of a split anti-Tory vote.

An intermediate case also exists, where a non-party campaign attempts to coordinate tactical voting, typically with the goal of defeating a certain party. Cases of this include the Canadian Anything But Conservative campaign, which opposed the Conservative Party of Canada in the 2008 and 2015 federal elections, or the Smart Voting campaign organized by Russia's Anti-Corruption Foundation with the goal of opposing and weakening the United Russia party in the 2021 Russian legislative election. This also occurred in the UK 2019 General Election, where voting groups such as Tactical Vote and Turf Out The Tories, promoted tactical voting to prevent a Conservative majority.

== Examples in real elections ==
=== Canada ===
The observed effect of Duverger's law in Canada is weaker than in other countries. In the 1999 Ontario provincial election, strategic voting was encouraged by opponents of the Progressive Conservative government of Mike Harris. This failed to unseat Harris but succeeded in suppressing the Ontario New Democratic Party vote to a historic low.

In the 2004 federal election, and to a lesser extent in the 2006 election, strategic voting was a concern for the federal New Democratic Party (NDP). In the 2004 election, the governing Liberal Party was able to convince many New Democratic voters to vote Liberal to avoid a Conservative government. In the 2006 elections, the Liberal Party attempted the same strategy, with Prime Minister Paul Martin asking New Democrats and Greens to vote for the Liberal Party to prevent a Conservative win. The New Democratic Party leader Jack Layton responded by asking voters to "lend" their votes to his party, suggesting that the Liberal Party was bound to lose the election regardless of strategic voting. This failed to prevent the Conservatives from winning the election, although they did not win a majority of seats.

During the 2015 federal election, strategic voting was used extensively against the Conservative government of Stephen Harper, which had benefited from vote splitting among centrist and left-leaning parties in the 2011 election. Following the landslide victory of the Liberals led by Justin Trudeau over Harper's Conservatives, experts argued that this dramatic increase in support for the Liberals at the expense of the NDP and Green Party was partially due to strategic voting for Liberal candidates. In three weeks, 1.4 million voters switched from NDP to Liberal. In at least two closely contested ridings, strategic voting websites obtained enough pledges to account for the victory margin of the Liberal candidate.

=== France ===
The two-round system in France shows strategic voting in the first round, due to considerations which candidate will reach the second round.

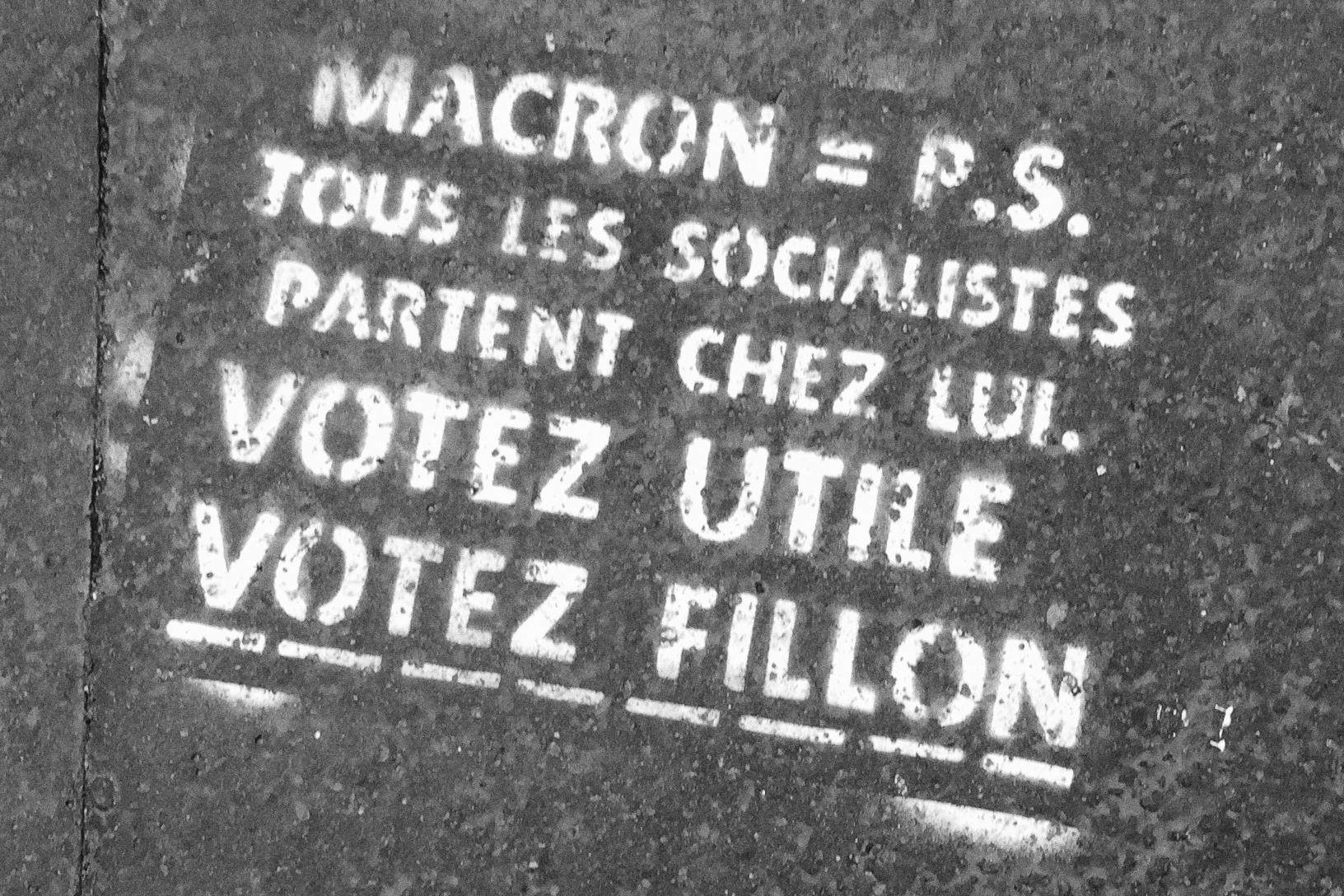
Stenciling on a Parisian sidewalk ahead of the first round of the 2017 French presidential election invoking "votez utile" (strategic voting) as a reason for voters to vote for François Fillon instead of Emmanuel Macron

=== Germany ===
The mixed-member proportional representation allows to estimate the share of strategic voters in first-past-the-post voting due to the separate votes for party-lists and local single-winner electoral district candidates. The vote for party-lists is considered sincere if the party vote share is significantly above the 5% electoral threshold in Germany. In Germany the share of strategic voters was found around 30%, which decreased to 9% if only non-allied party candidates were contenders for the electoral district winner. In a contentious election year the share of strategic voters increased to around 45%.

Due to electoral threshold in party-list proportional representation one party asked in several elections their voters to vote for another allied party to help this party cross the electoral threshold.

=== Hong Kong ===
In Hong Kong, with its party-list proportional representation using largest remainder method with the Hare quota, voters supporting candidates of the pro-democracy camp often organize to divide their votes across different tickets, avoiding the concentration of votes on one or a few candidates. In 2016 Hong Kong Legislative Election, the practices of strategic voting were expanded by Benny Tai's Project ThunderGo. The anti-establishment camp gained 29 seats, a historical record.

=== Hungary ===
In Hungary, during the 2018 Hungarian parliamentary election, several websites, such as taktikaiszavazas.hu (meaning "strategic voting"), promoted the idea to vote for opposition candidates with the highest probability of winning a given seat. About a quarter of opposition voters adopted this behavior, resulting in a total of 498,000 extra votes gained by opposition parties. A total of 14 extra single seats were taken by several parties and independent candidates.

=== Lithuania ===
In Lithuania, which has a parallel voting system at parliamentary and district levels, most of strategic voting takes place in single-member constituencies (or districts in mayoral elections). These constituencies have two-round system when no candidate wins more than 50 per cent of the votes in the first round. A notable example of strategic voting at the parliamentary level could be the 10th Naujoji Vilnia constituency in 2016 Lithuanian parliamentary election. To prevent independent candidate Algirdas Paleckis' victory, the Liberal Movement's, the Lithuanian Farmers and Greens Union's and the Social Democratic Party's candidates endorsed their supporters to vote for the Homeland Union's candidate Monika Navickienė (who came in second place). Monika Navickienė eventually won the constituency by around 900 votes. At a district level, an example could be Kėdainiai district's mayoral election in the 2015 municipal elections. In the first round, the Labour Party won 13 seats of 26 seats in district council and was just one seat short of absolute majority. Nijolė Naujokienė (candidate to the district's mayoral seat from the Labour Party) came short by 0.68 per cent in the mayoral election. Her opponent, Saulius Grinkevičius, had a 22 per cent gap to overcome. In the second round, Saulius Grinkevičius won by around 8 per cent (and 1,600 votes).

=== New Zealand ===
Since New Zealand moved to mixed-member proportional representation voting in 1996, the electoral system of New Zealand has seen strategic voting regularly occur in several elections, including one party explicitly or implicitly encouraging voters to vote for a candidate other than theirs. This happened first in 1996 in the Wellington Central, and then in 1999 in the Coromandel. From 1996 until 2005, it was a regular feature in the Ohariu-Belmont electorate, which was won by Peter Dunne throughout its existence, and from 2005 in the Epsom electorate, which has been won solely by the ACT party since 2005.

=== Poland ===
In the 2023 Polish parliamentary election, websites like pogonimypis.pl (meaning "We'll chase away the PiS") gave information for which parties voters should vote for in their constituency in order to maximize the chance of the opposition winning the extra seat. The campaign was a success, with PiS losing the majority in the Sejm. At the same time, a referendum with the questions asked in a persuasive way took place, with the opposition recommending to not take the referendal card. The voter turnout of the referendum is 40%, making it non-binding and merely a suggestion for all the future governments.

=== Slovenia ===
According to some media, in the 2011 Slovenian parliamentary election, 30% of voters voted tactically. Public polls predicted an easy win for Janez Janša, the candidate of the Slovenian Democratic Party; however, his opponent Zoran Janković, the candidate of Positive Slovenia, won. Prominent Slovenian public opinion researchers claimed that such proportions of strategic voting had not been recorded anywhere else before.

=== Spain ===
In the 2016 General Election in Spain, the incentives for voting tactically were much larger than usual, following the rise of the Podemos and Ciudadanos and following the economic crisis and election in 2015. The strategic voters successfully influenced the outcome of the election, despite a record low turnout of 66.5%. In a natural experiment in Andalusia 9% voted strategically when having opportunity, strategic behavior did not increase with time, and did not affect surrounding electoral areas, under the assumption that strategic voting happens only for district magnitude above 5.

=== Taiwan ===
In the 1995 Legislative Yuan election, strategic voting was implemented by the opposition parties, such as the Democratic Progressive Party and the New Party. As the members were elected in multi-member districts, the parties urged their supporters to vote for a party-nominated candidate according to criteria, such as the last digit of the voter's National Identification Card Number or the voter's birth month. This maximized the opposition's seat gains and resulted in the ruling Kuomintang losing 10 seats, receiving the lowest share of seats in history at the time.

=== United Kingdom ===
In the 1997 UK general election, Democratic Left helped Bruce Kent set up GROT (Get Rid Of Them) a strategic voter campaign whose aim was to help prevent the Conservative Party from gaining a 5th term in office. This coalition was drawn from individuals in all the main opposition parties, and many who were not aligned with any party. While it is hard to prove that GROT swung the election itself, it did attract significant media attention and brought strategic voting into the mainstream for the first time in UK politics. In 2001, the Democratic Left's successor organisation, the New Politics Network, organised a similar campaign. Since then strategic voting has become a consideration in British politics as is reflected in by-elections and by the growth in sites such as tacticalvote.co.uk, who encourage strategic voting as a way of defusing the two party system and empowering the individual voter. For the 2015 UK general election, voteswap.org attempted to prevent the Conservative Party staying in government by encouraging Green Party supporters to tactically vote for the Labour Party in listed marginal seats. In 2017 swapmyvote.uk was formed to help supporters of all parties swap their votes with people in other constituencies.

In the 2006 local elections in London, strategic voting was promoted by sites such as London Strategic Voter in a response to national and international issues.

In Northern Ireland, it is believed that (predominantly Protestant) Unionist voters in Nationalist strongholds have voted for the Social Democratic and Labour Party (SDLP) to prevent Sinn Féin from capturing such seats. This conclusion was reached by comparing results to the demographics of constituencies and polling districts.

In the 2017 general election, it is estimated that 6.5 million people (more than 20% of voters) voted tactically either as a way of preventing a "hard Brexit" or preventing another Conservative government led by the Tactical2017 campaign. Many Green Party candidates withdrew from the race in order to help the Labour Party secure closely fought seats against the Conservatives. This ultimately led to the Conservatives losing seats in the election even though they increased their overall vote share.

In the 2019 Conservative Party leadership election to determine the final two candidates for the party vote, it was suggested that front-runner Boris Johnson's campaign encouraged some of its MPs to back Jeremy Hunt instead of Johnson, so that Hunt – seen as "a lower-energy challenger" – would finish in second place, allowing an easier defeat in the party vote. Strategic voting was expected to play a major role in the 2019 General Election, with a YouGov poll suggesting that 19% of voters would be doing so tactically. 49% of strategic voters said they would do so in the hope of stopping a party whose views they opposed.

According to a 2020 study, older voters in the UK vote strategically more than younger voters, and richer voters vote more strategically than poorer voters.

In an example of individuals voting tactically, Labour voters in the 2022 Tiverton and Honiton by-election in the UK tactically supported the Liberal Democrat candidate in order to ensure the defeat of the Conservatives. This resulted in the Liberal Democrats winning what had previously been a Conservative safe seat.

In 2024, tactical voting was again advocated for the 2024 general election, as a means to defeat Conservative candidates in seats with traditional large Conservative majorities.

=== United States ===
Strategic voting in the US's first-past-the-post voting and presidential system contributes to a two-party system, where the observed effect of Duverger's law is stronger than in most countries.

In 2000, 2016, and 2024, a significant number of voters in the Presidential elections opted to use vote swapping to increase Democratic turnout in swing states and third-party turnout in safe states.

One high-profile example of strategic voting was the 2002 California gubernatorial election. During the Republican primaries, Republicans Richard Riordan (former mayor of Los Angeles) and Bill Simon (a self-financed businessman) vied for a chance to compete against the unpopular incumbent Democratic Governor of California, Gray Davis. Polls predicted that Riordan would defeat Davis, while Simon would not. At that time, the Republican primaries were partially closed primaries in which non-partisans and registered Republicans could vote regardless of their party affiliation. Davis supporters (those were eligible to vote in the Republican primary) were rumored to have voted for Simon because Riordan was perceived as a greater threat to Davis; this, combined with a negative advertising campaign by Davis describing Riordan as a "big-city liberal", allowed Simon to win the primary despite a last-minute business scandal. The strategy to nominate Simon (if in fact it was a reality), was successful, as he lost in the general election against Davis. However, it resulted in the lowest gubernatorial general election turnout in modern California political history, thus requiring fewer signatures to qualify a recall that ultimately ousted Davis.

Similarly, in 2012, Claire McCaskill boosted Todd Akin in the 2012 US Senate election in Missouri. In addition to running ads highlighting Akin's conservative stances, McCaskill also directed messages to surrogates to tell Akin to run ads which would increase his primary polling.

==== Puerto Rico ====
Puerto Rico's 2004 elections were affected by strategic voting. Pedro Rosselló, the New Progressive Party's candidate of that year, was unpopular across much of the territory due to large corruption schemes and the privatization of public corporations. To prevent Rossell from winning, other factions supported the Partido Popular Democratico's candidate. The elections were close; statehood advocates won a seat in the U.S. house of representatives and majorities in both legislative branches, but lost governance to Aníbal Acevedo Vilá. (Puerto Ricans have the chance to vote by party or by candidate. Separatists voted under their ideology but for the center party's candidate, which caused major turmoil.) After a recount and a trial, Acevedo Vilá was certified as governor of the Commonwealth of Puerto Rico.

== Rational voter model ==
Analysis of strategic voting is commonly based on a model of behavior where voters are short-term instrumentally rational. That is, voters are only voting in order to make an impact on one election at a time (not, say, to build the political party for next election); voters have a set of sincere preferences, or utility rankings, by which to rate candidates; voters have some knowledge of each other's preferences; and voters understand how best to use strategic voting to their advantage. The extent to which this model resembles real-life elections is the subject of considerable academic debate.

=== Myerson–Weber strategy ===
An example of a rational voter strategy is described by Myerson and Weber. The strategy is broadly applicable to a number of single-winner voting methods that are additive point methods, such as Plurality, Borda, Approval, and Range. The strategy is optimal in the sense that the strategy will maximize the voter's expected utility when the number of voters is sufficiently large.

This rational voter model assumes that the voter's utility of the election result is dependent only on which candidate wins and not on any other aspect of the election, for example showing support for a losing candidate in the vote tallies. The model also assumes the voter chooses how to vote individually and not in collaboration with other voters.

Given a set of k candidates and a voter let:

v_{i} = the number of points to be voted for candidate i
u_{i} = the voter's gain in utility if candidate i wins the election
p_{ij} = the (voter's perceived) pivot probability that candidates i and j will be tied for the most total points to win the election.

Then the voter's prospective rating for a candidate i is defined as:

$$R_i = \sum_{j \neq i} \; p_{ij} \cdot (u_i - u_j)\,$$

The gain in expected utility for a given vote is given by:

$$G(p,v,u) = \sum_{i=1}^k \; v_i \cdot R_i\,$$

The gain in expected utility can be maximized by choosing a vote with suitable values of v_{i}, depending on the voting method and the voter's prospective ratings for each candidate. For specific voting methods, the gain can be maximized using the following rules:

- Plurality: Vote for the candidate with the highest prospective rating. This is different from choosing the best of the frontrunners, which is a common heuristic approach to voting. In rare cases, the highest prospective rating can belong to a weak candidate (one with a low probability of winning).
- Borda: Rank the candidates in decreasing order of prospective rating.
- Approval: Vote for all candidates that have a positive prospective rating.
- Range: Vote the maximum (minimum) for all candidates with a positive (negative) prospective rating.

Pivot probabilities are rarely estimated in political forecasting, but can be estimated with winning probabilities predicted from opinion polls.

== Pre-election influence ==
Strategic voting requires voters to be informed, as they can only gauge who is in the leading and who may not be a viable candidate through the information they are supplied. Because strategic voting relies heavily on voters' perception of how other voters intend to vote, campaigns in electoral methods that promote compromise frequently focus on affecting voters' perception of campaign viability. Most campaigns craft refined media strategies to shape the way voters see their candidacy. During this phase, there can be an analogous effect where campaign donors and activists may decide whether or not to support candidates tactically with their money and time.

In rolling elections, where some voters have information about previous voters' preferences (e.g. presidential primaries in the United States), candidates put disproportionate resources into competing strongly in the first few stages, because those stages affect the reaction of later stages.

Perceived influence on other voters also interacts with strategic voting. In a study of the Israeli voting system, presumed media influence was found to be a variable in the case of why voters partake in strategic voting. Because the Israeli electoral system is complex, with many parties, and parliamentary, this perceived media influence effect may have a larger and more observable effect on simpler systems such as the one in the United States.

Game theory has been used to search for some kind of "minimally manipulable" (incentive compatibility) voting schemes. Game theory can also be used to analyze the pros and cons of different methods. For instance, when electors vote for their own preferences rather than tactically, Condorcet method-like methods tend to settle on compromise candidates, while instant-runoff voting favors those candidates with strong core support but otherwise narrower appeal due to holding more uncompromising positions. Thus, Condorcet methods incentivize candidates to position themselves closer to the median voter and appeal to a wider section of the electorate than instant-runoff voting does.

== By method ==
=== Plurality voting ===
Lesser-evil voting is exceedingly common in first-past-the-post voting elections, where the first preference is all that counts. According to the Myerson–Weber strategy lesser-evil voting among top two frontrunners is the optimal strategic voting in single-winner plurality voting. The most typical tactic is to assess which two candidates are frontrunners (most likely to win) and to vote for the preferred one of those two, even if a third candidate is preferred over both. Duverger's law is the observation that first-past-the-post voting strategic voting tends to produce two-party domination.

=== Plurality-runoff family (RCV, two-round, and partisan primaries) ===
Theoretical results indicate that, under two-round runoff voting with three candidates, strategic equilibria exist in which only two candidates receive votes. It has been shown experimentally that voters are influenced by a candidate's perceived likelihood of winning the election.

Instant runoff voting is vulnerable to three of the four kinds of strategy discussed above. It is vulnerable to lesser-evil voting; to turkey-raising; and to strategic truncation.

There is a common misconception that instant-runoff is not affected by a kind of strategic voting called truncation or bullet voting. However, satisfying later-no-harm does not (by itself) provide resistance to such strategies, unless paired with the participation criterion. Systems like instant runoff that pass later-no-harm but fail participation still incentivize truncation or bullet voting in some situations.

=== Cardinal single-winner voting ===
Most cardinal, single-winner voting systems in large elections encourage similar strategies:

1. Calculate the expected (average) utility of the election result (the average utility if the election was repeated many times).
2. Top-rate all candidates with above-average utility, and bottom-rate all candidates with below-average utility.

Such a strategy involves "semi-honest exaggeration". Unlike in most voting systems, voters rarely (if ever) have an incentive to lie about which of two candidates they prefer; instead, voters exaggerate the difference between a certain pair of candidates without ranking any less-preferred candidate over any more-preferred one.

Typically, this would not be the case unless there were two similar candidates favored by the same set of voters. A strategic vote against a similar rival could result in a favored candidate winning; although if voters for both similar rivals used this strategy, it could cause a candidate favored by neither of these voter groups to win.

Balinski and Laraki noted that under majority judgment, many voters (about half) have no opportunity or incentive to use strategy. They argued based on a simulation that the highest median methods minimized the number of voters with an incentive to misrepresent their opinions, among the methods they studied. Exaggeration in majority judgment has an effect whenever the voter's honest rating for the intended winner is below that candidate's median rating; or when their honest rating for the intended loser is above it. In other words, half of voters will have an incentive to strategize, while half will not.

Strategic voters are faced with the initial tactic as to how highly to score their second-choice candidate. The voter may want to retain expression of a high preference of their favorite candidate over their second choice. But that does not allow the same voter to express a high preference of their second choice over any others.

In approval voting, because the only option is to approve of a candidate or not, optimal strategic voting rarely includes approving a less-preferred candidate but not a more-preferred one. However, strategy is in fact inevitable when a voter decides their "approval cutoff". Steven Brams and Dudley R. Herschbach argued in a paper in Science magazine in 2001 that approval voting was the method least amenable to tactical perturbations.

Balinski and Laraki used rated ballots from a poll of the 2007 French presidential election to show that, if unstrategic voters only approved candidates whom they considered "very good" or better, strategic voters would be able to sway the result frequently, but that if unstrategic voters approved all candidates they considered "good" or better, approval was the second most strategy-resistant method of the ones they studied, after majority judgment itself.

=== Ranked single-winner voting ===
The Borda count has both a strong incentive and a large vulnerability to burial. Here is a hypothetical example of both factors at the same time: if there are two candidates the most likely to win, the voter can maximize the impact on the contest between these candidates by ranking the candidate the voter likes more in first place, ranking the candidate whom they like less in last place. If neither candidate is the sincere first or last choice, the voter is using both the compromising and burying strategies at once. If many different groups voters use this strategy, this gives a paradoxical advantage to the candidate generally thought least likely to win.

=== Condorcet ===
Condorcet methods are vulnerable to 3 of the 4 kinds of strategy listed above, because the Condorcet winner criterion is incompatible with the sincere favorite criterion, participation criterion, later-no-harm, and later-no-help. Strategy in Condorcet methods can become highly complex, but almost always involves burial or truncation.

=== Multi-winner voting ===
==== Single transferable vote ====
The single transferable vote may incentivize free-riding: if a voter expects their favorite candidate will almost-certainly be elected, insincerely ranking the second candidate first does not hurt the favored candidate.

Some forms of STV allow strategic voters to gain an advantage by listing a candidate who is very likely to lose in first place. This strategy, called Woodall free riding, is essentially eliminated by Meek's method; however, Meek's method is rarely used because of its substantial complexity, having been adopted only for some local elections in New Zealand.

In Malta's STV, the two-party system can cause strategic voting away from third parties.

== See also ==
- Electoral fusion
- Keynesian beauty contest
- Lesser of two evils
- Primary election
- Ranked voting
- Strategic nomination
- Strategyproofness
- Vote allocation
- Vote swapping

== Sources ==
- Cox, Gary (1997). Making Votes Count : Strategic Coordination in the World's Electoral Systems. Cambridge University Press. p. 340. ISBN 978-0-521-58527-9. Archived from the original on 25 June 2015.
- Svensson, Lars-Gunnar (1999). "The Proof of the Gibbard–Satterthwaite Theorem Revisited"
- Fisher, Stephen (2001). "Extending the Rational Voter Theory of Tactical Voting"
