= Positional voting =

Class of ranked-choice electoral systems

Positional voting is a ranked voting electoral system in which the options or candidates receive points based on their rank position on each ballot and the one with the most points overall wins. The lower-ranked preference in any adjacent pair is generally of less value than the higher-ranked one. Although it may sometimes be weighted the same, it is never worth more. A valid progression of points or weightings may be chosen at will (Eurovision Song Contest) or it may form a mathematical sequence such as an arithmetic progression (Borda count), a geometric one (positional number system) or a harmonic one (Nauru/Dowdall method). The set of weightings employed in an election heavily influences the rank ordering of the candidates. The steeper the initial decline in preference values with descending rank, the more polarised and less consensual the positional voting system becomes.

Positional voting should be distinguished from score voting: in the former, the score that each voter gives to each candidate is uniquely determined by the candidate's rank; in the latter, each voter is free to give any score to any candidate.

== Voting and counting ==
In positional voting, voters complete a ranked ballot by expressing their preferences in rank order. The rank position of each voter preference is allotted a specific fixed weighting. Typically, the higher the rank of the preference, the more points it is worth. Occasionally, it may share the same weighting as a lower-ranked preference but it is never worth fewer points.

Usually, every voter is required to express a unique ordinal preference for each option on the ballot in strict descending rank order. However, a particular positional voting system may permit voters to truncate their preferences after expressing one or more of them and to leave the remaining options unranked and consequently worthless. Similarly, some other systems may limit the number of preferences that can be expressed. For example, in the Eurovision Song Contest only their top ten preferences are ranked by each country although many more than ten songs compete in the contest. Again, unranked preferences have no value. In positional voting, ranked ballots with tied options are normally considered as invalid.

The counting process is straightforward. All the preferences cast by voters are awarded the points associated with their rank position. Then, all the points for each option are tallied and the one with the most points is the winner. Where a few winners (W) are instead required following the count, the W highest-ranked options are selected. Positional voting is not only a means of identifying a single winner but also a method for converting sets of individual preferences (ranked ballots) into one collective and fully rank-ordered set. It is possible and legitimate for options to be tied in this resultant set; even in first place.

=== Example ===
Consider a positional voting election for choosing a single winner from three options A, B and C. No truncation or ties are permitted and a first, second and third preference is here worth 4, 2 and 1 point respectively. There are then six different ways in which each voter may rank order these options. The 100 voters cast their ranked ballots as follows:

Number of ballots	First preference	Second preference	Third preference
24	A	B	C
18	A	C	B
12	B	A	C
16	B	C	A
20	C	A	B
10	C	B	A

After voting closes, the points awarded by the voters are then tallied and the options ranked according to the points total.

Option	Points to be tallied	Total	Overall rank
A	(24 + 18) x 4 + (12 + 20) x 2 + (16 + 10) x 1	258	First
B	(12 + 16) x 4 + (24 + 10) x 2 + (18 + 20) x 1	218	Third
C	(20 + 10) x 4 + (18 + 16) x 2 + (24 + 12) x 1	224	Second

Therefore, having the highest tally, option A is the winner here. Note that the election result also generates a full ranking of all the options.

== Point distributions ==
For positional voting, any distribution of points to the rank positions is valid, so long as the points are weakly decreasing in the rank of each candidate. In other words, a worse-ranked candidate must not receive more points than a better-ranked candidate.

=== Borda (Unbiased) ===
The classic example of a positional voting electoral system is the Borda count. Typically, for a single-winner election with N candidates, a first preference is worth N points, a second preference N – 1 points, a third preference N – 2 points and so on until the last (Nth) preference that is worth just 1 point. So, for example, the points are respectively 4, 3, 2 and 1 for a four-candidate election.

Mathematically, the point value or weighting (w_{n}) associated with a given rank position (n) is defined below; where the weighting of the first preference is a and the common difference is d.

$$w_n = a - (n-1)d$$

where a = N, the number of candidates.

The value of the first preference need not be N. It is sometimes set to N – 1 so that the last preference is worth zero. Although it is convenient for counting, the common difference need not be fixed at one since the overall ranking of the candidates is unaffected by its specific value. Hence, despite generating differing tallies, any value of a or d for a Borda count election will result in identical candidate rankings.

The consecutive Borda count weightings form an arithmetic progression.

=== Top-heavy ===
Common systems for evaluating preferences, other than Borda, are typically "top-heavy". In other words, the method focuses on how many voters consider a candidate one of their "favourites".

==== Plurality voting ====
Under first-preference plurality (FPP), the most-preferred option receives 1 point while all other options receive 0 points each. This is the most top-heavy positional voting system.

==== Geometric ====
An alternative mathematical sequence known as a geometric progression may also be used in positional voting. Here, there is instead a common ratio r between adjacent weightings. In order to satisfy the two validity conditions, the value of r must be less than one so that weightings decrease as preferences descend in rank. Where the value of the first preference is a, the weighting (w_{n}) awarded to a given rank position (n) is defined below.

$$w_n = ar^{n-1}, \qquad 0 \leq r < 1$$

For example, the sequence of consecutively halved weightings of 1, 1/2, 1/4, 1/8, … as used in the binary number system constitutes a geometric progression with a common ratio of one-half (r = 1/2). Such weightings are inherently valid for use in positional voting systems provided that a legitimate common ratio is employed. Using a common ratio of zero, this form of positional voting has weightings of 1, 0, 0, 0, … and so produces ranking outcomes identical to that for first-past-the-post or plurality voting.

==== Dowdall system (Nauru) ====
Alternatively, the denominators of the above fractional weightings could form an arithmetic progression instead; namely 1/1, 1/2, 1/3, 1/4 and so on down to 1/N. This further mathematical sequence is an example of a harmonic progression. These particular descending rank-order weightings are in fact used in N-candidate positional voting elections to the Nauru parliament. For such electoral systems, the weighting (w_{n}) allocated to a given rank position (n) is defined below; where the value of the first preference is a.

$$w_n = \frac{a^2}{a + (n-1)d} = \frac{a}{1 + \frac{(n-1)d}{a}},$$

where w_{1} = a.

For the Nauru system, the first preference a is worth one and the common difference d between adjacent denominators is also one. Numerous other harmonic sequences can also be used in positional voting. For example, setting a to 1 and d to 2 generates the reciprocals of all the odd numbers (1, 1/3, 1/5, 1/7, …) whereas letting a be 1/2 and d be 1/2 produces those of all the even numbers (1/2, 1/4, 1/6, 1/8, …).

The harmonic variant used by the island nation of Nauru is called the Dowdall system as it was devised by Nauru's Secretary for Justice (Desmond Dowdall) in 1971. Here, each voter awards the first-ranked candidate with 1 point, while the 2nd-ranked candidate receives 1/2 a point, the 3rd-ranked candidate receives 1/3 of a point, etc. When counting candidate tallies in Nauru, decimal numbers rounded to three places after the decimal point are employed rather than fractions. (This system should not be confused with the use of sequential divisors in proportional systems such as proportional approval voting, an unrelated method.) A similar system of weighting lower-preference votes was used in the 1925 Oklahoma primary electoral system.

For a four-candidate election, the Dowdall point distribution would be this:

Ranking	Candidate	Formula	Points
1st	Andrew	1/1	1.000
2nd	Brian	1/2	0.500
3rd	Catherine	1/3	0.333
4th	David	1/4	0.250

This method is more favourable to candidates with many first preferences than the conventional Borda count. It has been described as a system "somewhere between plurality and the Borda count, but as veering more towards plurality". Simulations show that 30% of Nauru elections would produce different outcomes if counted using standard Borda rules.

==== Eurovision ====
The Eurovision Song Contest uses a first preference worth 12 points, while a second one is given 10 points. The next eight consecutive preferences are awarded 8, 7, 6, 5, 4, 3, 2 and 1 point. All remaining preferences receive zero points.

==== Sports and awards ====
Positional voting methods are used in some sports, either for combining rankings in different events or for judging contestants. For instance, points systems are used to keep score in Formula One and for the Major League Baseball Most Valuable Player Award. These applications tend to also be top-heavy: both the F1 and baseball MVP points systems favor the top end.

=== Comparison of progression types ===
In positional voting, the weightings (w) of consecutive preferences from first to last decline monotonically with rank position (n). However, the rate of decline varies according to the type of progression employed. Lower preferences are more influential in election outcomes where the chosen progression employs a sequence of weightings that descend relatively slowly with rank position. The more slowly weightings decline, the more consensual and less polarising positional voting becomes.

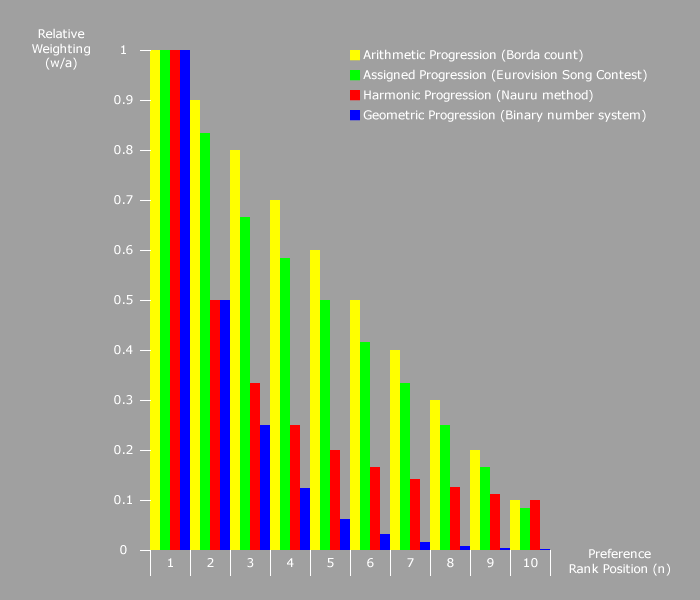
Relative decline in preference weightings with descending rank order for four positional voting electoral systems

This figure illustrates such declines over ten preferences for the following four positional voting electoral systems:

- Borda count (where a = N = 10 and d = 1)
- Binary number system (where a = 1 and r = 1/2)
- Nauru method (where a = 1 and d = 1)
- Eurovision Song Contest (non-zero preferences only)

To aid comparison, the actual weightings have been normalised; namely that the first preference is set at one and the other weightings in the particular sequence are scaled by the same factor of 1/a.

The relative decline of weightings in any arithmetic progression is constant as it is not a function of the common difference d. In other words, the relative difference between adjacent weightings is fixed at 1/N. In contrast, the value of d in a harmonic progression does affect the rate of its decline. The higher its value, the faster the weightings descend. Whereas the lower the value of the common ratio r for a geometric progression, the faster its weightings decline.

The weightings of the digit positions in the binary number system were chosen here to highlight an example of a geometric progression in positional voting. In fact, the consecutive weightings of any digital number system can be employed since they all constitute geometric progressions. For example, the binary, ternary, octal and decimal number systems use a radix R of 2, 3, 8 and 10 respectively. The value R is also the common ratio of the geometric progression going up in rank order while r is the complementary common ratio descending in rank. Therefore, r is the reciprocal of R and the r ratios are respectively 1/2, 1/3, 1/8 and 1/10 for these positional number systems when employed in positional voting.

As it has the smallest radix, the rate of decline in preference weightings is slowest when using the binary number system. Although the radix R (the number of unique digits used in the number system) has to be an integer, the common ratio r for positional voting does not have to be the reciprocal of such an integer. Any value between zero and just less than one is valid. For a slower descent of weightings than that generated using the binary number system, a common ratio greater than one-half must be employed. The higher the value of r, the slower the decrease in weightings with descending rank.

== Analysis of non-ranking systems ==
Although not categorised as positional voting electoral systems, some non-ranking methods can nevertheless be analysed mathematically as if they were by allocating points appropriately. Given the absence of strict monotonic ranking here, all favoured options are weighted identically with a high value and all the remaining options with a common lower value. The two validity criteria for a sequence of weightings are hence satisfied.

For an N-candidate ranked ballot, let the permitted number of favoured candidates per ballot be F and the two weightings be one point for these favoured candidates and zero points for those not favoured. When analytically represented using positional voting, favoured candidates must be listed in the top F rank positions in any order on each ranked ballot and the other candidates in the bottom N-F rank positions. This is essential as the weighting of each rank position is fixed and common to each and every ballot in positional voting.

Unranked single-winner methods that can be analysed as positional voting electoral systems include:

- First-preference plurality voting (FPP): The most preferred option receives 1 point; all other options receive 0 points each. (F = 1)
- Anti-plurality voting: The least preferred option receives 0 points; all other options receive 1 point each. (F = N – 1)

And unranked methods for multiple-winner elections (with W winners) include:

- Single non-transferable vote: The most preferred option receives 1 point; all other options receive 0 points each. (F = 1)
- Limited voting: The X most preferred options (where 1 < X < W) receive 1 point each; all other options receive 0 points each. (F = X) Usually voters may use less than the allowed number of marks, so it is usually not a positional system as that would require voters to vote for exactly X amount of candidates (or the system would reweight points automatically, similarly to equal ranks in single-winner variants).
- Bloc voting: The W most preferred options receive 1 point each; all other options receive 0 points each. (F = W). Usually voters may use less than the allowed number of marks, which makes this common variant not a positional system.

In approval voting, voters are free to favour as many or as few candidates as they wish so F is not fixed but varies according to the individual ranked ballots being cast. As rank positions would then have different weightings on different ballots, approval voting is not a positional voting system; nor can it be analysed as such.

== Comparative examples ==
Tennessee voting pattern

42% of voters	26% of voters	15% of voters	17% of voters
1. Memphis; 2. Nashville; 3. Chattanooga; 4. Knoxville	1. Nashville; 2. Chattanooga; 3. Knoxville; 4. Memphis	1. Chattanooga; 2. Knoxville; 3. Nashville; 4. Memphis	1. Knoxville; 2. Chattanooga; 3. Nashville; 4. Memphis

Suppose Tennessee is holding an election on the location of its capital. The population is split between four cities, and all the voters want the capital to be as close to them as possible. The options are:

- Memphis, large but far to the west
- Nashville, medium, near the center
- Chattanooga, small and in the east
- Knoxville, small and isolated

Where w_{n} is the weighting of the nth preference, the following table defines the resultant tally calculation for each city:

Voters' home city	Vote tally per 1200 voters
Memphis	(42w_{1} + 26w_{4} + 15w_{4} + 17w_{4}) x 1200/100
Nashville	(42w_{2} + 26w_{1} + 15w_{3} + 17w_{3}) x 1200/100
Chattanooga	(42w_{3} + 26w_{2} + 15w_{1} + 17w_{2}) x 1200/100
Knoxville	(42w_{4} + 26w_{3} + 15w_{2} + 17w_{1}) x 1200/100

For a first preference worth w_{1} = 1, the table below states the value of each of the four weightings for a range of different positional voting systems that could be employed for this election:

Voting system	w_{1}	w_{2}	w_{3}	w_{4}	Sum
Plurality	1	0	0	0	1
Binary number system	1	1/2	1/4	1/8	1.875
Nauru method	1	1/2	1/3	1/4	2.083
Borda count	1	3/4	1/2	1/4	2.5
Anti-plurality	1	1	1	0	3

These five positional voting systems are listed in progression type order. The slower the decline in weighting values with descending rank order, the greater is the sum of the four weightings; see end column. Plurality declines the fastest while anti-plurality is the slowest.

For each positional voting system, the tallies for each of the four city options are determined from the above two tables and stated below:

Voting system	Memphis	Nashville	Chattanooga	Knoxville
Plurality	504	312	180	204
Binary number system	591	660	564	435
Nauru method	678	692	606	524
Borda count	678	882	819	621
Anti-plurality	504	1200	1200	696

For each potential positional voting system that could be used in this election, the consequent overall rank order of the options is shown below:

Voting system	First place	Second place	Third place	Fourth place
Plurality	Memphis	Nashville	Knoxville	Chattanooga
Binary number system	Nashville	Memphis	Chattanooga	Knoxville
Nauru method	Nashville	Memphis	Chattanooga	Knoxville
Borda count	Nashville	Chattanooga	Memphis	Knoxville
Anti-plurality	Chattanooga / Nashville		Knoxville	Memphis

This table highlights the importance of progression type in determining the winning outcome. With all voters either strongly for or against Memphis, it is a very ‘polarized’ option so Memphis finishes first under plurality and last with anti-plurality. Given its central location, Nashville is the ‘consensus’ option here. It wins under the Borda count and the two other non-polarized systems

== Evaluation against voting system criteria ==
As a class of voting systems, positional voting can be evaluated against objective mathematical criteria to evaluate its strengths and weaknesses in comparison with other single-winner electoral methods.

Positional voting satisfies the following criteria:

- Non-dictatorship
- Unrestricted domain
- Summability (with order N)
- Consistency
- Participation
- Resolvability
- Monotonicity
- Pareto efficiency

But it fails to satisfy the following criteria:

- Independence of Irrelevant Alternatives (IIA)
- Independence of Clones (IoC)
- Condorcet winner
- Condorcet loser (except the Borda count)
- Reversal symmetry (except the Borda count)
- Majority (except when equivalent to plurality)

According to Arrow’s impossibility theorem, no ranked voting system can satisfy all of the following four criteria when collectively ranking three or more alternatives:

- Non-dictatorship
- Unrestricted domain
- Pareto efficiency
- Independence of Irrelevant Alternatives (IIA)

Prior to voter preferences being cast, voting systems that treat all voters as equals and all candidates as equals pass the first two criteria above. So, like any other ranking system, positional voting cannot pass both of the other two. It is Pareto efficient but is not independent of irrelevant alternatives. This failure means that the addition or deletion of a non-winning (irrelevant) candidate may alter who wins the election despite the ranked preferences of all voters remaining the same.

=== IIA example ===
Consider a positional voting election with three candidates A, B and C where a first, second and third preference is worth 4, 2 and 1 point respectively. The 12 voters cast their ranked ballots as follows:

Number of ballots	First preference	Second preference	Third preference
5	A	B	C
4	B	C	A
3	C	A	B

The election outcome is hence:

Candidate	Points to be tallied	Total	Overall rank
A	(5 x 4) + (3 x 2) + (4 x 1)	30	First
B	(4 x 4) + (5 x 2) + (3 x 1)	29	Second
C	(3 x 4) + (4 x 2) + (5 x 1)	25	Third

Therefore, candidate A is the single winner and candidates B and C are the two losers. As an irrelevant alternative (loser), whether B enters the contest or not should make no difference to A winning provided the voting system is IIA compliant.

Rerunning the election without candidate B while maintaining the correct ranked preferences for A and C, the 12 ballots are now cast as follows:

Number of ballots	First preference	Second preference	Third preference
5	A	C	-
4	C	A	-
3	C	A	-

The rerun election outcome is now:

Candidate	Points to be tallied	Total	Overall rank
A	(5 x 4) + (7 x 2)	34	Second
C	(7 x 4) + (5 x 2)	38	First

Given the withdrawal of candidate B, the winner is now C and no longer A. Regardless of the specific points awarded to the rank positions of the preferences, there are always some cases where the addition or deletion of an irrelevant alternative alters the outcome of an election. Hence, positional voting is not IIA compliant.

=== IoC example ===
Positional voting also fails the independence of clones (IoC) criterion. The strategic nomination of clones is quite likely to significantly affect the outcome of an election and it is often the intention behind doing so. A clone is a nominally identical candidate to one already standing where voters are unable to distinguish between them unless informed as to which of the two is the clone. As tied rankings are not permitted, these two candidates must be ranked by voters in adjacent positions instead. Cloning may well promote or demote the collective ranking of any non-cloned candidate.

Consider a positional voting election in which three candidates may compete. There are just 12 voters and a first, second and third preference is worth 4, 2 and 1 point respectively.

In this first scenario, two candidates A and B are nominated but no clone enters the contest. The voters cast their ranked ballots as follows:

Number of ballots	First preference	Second preference	Third preference
6	A	B	-
6	B	A	-

The election outcome is hence:

Candidate	Points to be tallied	Total	Overall rank
A	(6 x 4) + (6 x 2)	36	First equal
B	(6 x 4) + (6 x 2)	36	First equal

Given equal support, there is an evitable tie for first place between A and B.

Suppose B, anticipating this tie, decided to enter a clone of itself. The nominated candidates are now A, B_{1} and B_{2}. As the voters are unable to distinguish between B_{1} and B_{2}, they are just a likely to rank B_{1} over B_{2} as to prefer B_{2} over B_{1}. In this second scenario, the 12 ballots are now cast as follows:

Number of ballots	First preference	Second preference	Third preference
3	A	B_{1}	B_{2}
3	A	B_{2}	B_{1}
3	B_{1}	B_{2}	A
3	B_{2}	B_{1}	A

The new election outcome is now:

Candidate	Points to be tallied	Total	Overall rank
A	(6 x 4) + (0 x 2) + (6 x 1)	30	First
B_{1}	(3 x 4) + (6 x 2) + (3 x 1)	27	Second equal
B_{2}	(3 x 4) + (6 x 2) + (3 x 1)	27	Second equal

By adding a clone of itself, B has handed victory to candidate A. This counter-productive ‘spoiler’ effect or act of self-harm is called vote-splitting.

To promote itself into first place, B should instead instruct all its supporters to always prefer one of its candidates (say B_{1}) over the other (B_{2}). In this third scenario, the 12 ballots are now cast as follows:

Number of ballots	First preference	Second preference	Third preference
3	A	B_{1}	B_{2}
3	A	B_{2}	B_{1}
6	B_{1}	B_{2}	A

The revised election outcome is now:

Candidate	Points to be tallied	Total	Overall rank
A	(6 x 4) + (0 x 2) + (6 x 1)	30	Second
B_{1}	(6 x 4) + (3 x 2) + (3 x 1)	33	First
B_{2}	(0 x 4) + (9 x 2) + (3 x 1)	21	Third

By ‘team’ B signalling to its own supporters - but not to A supporters - which of its two candidates it wants to win, B has achieved its objective of gaining victory for B_{1}. With no clone, A and B tie with equal numbers of first and second preferences. The introduction of clone B_{2} (an irrelevant alternative) has pushed the second preferences for A into third place while preferences for ‘team’ B (B or B_{1}) are unchanged in the first and third scenarios. This wilful act to ‘bury’ A and promote itself is called teaming. Note that if A signals to its own supporters to always prefer B_{2} over B_{1} in a tit-for-tat retaliation then the original tie between A and ‘team’ B is re-established.

To a greater or lesser extent, all positional voting systems are vulnerable to teaming; with the sole exception of a plurality-equivalent one. As only first preferences have any value, employing clones to ‘bury’ opponents down in rank never affects election outcomes. However, precisely because only first preferences have any value, plurality is instead particularly susceptible to vote-splitting. To a lesser extent, many other positional voting systems are also affected by ‘spoiler’ candidates. While inherently vulnerable to teaming, the Borda count is however invulnerable to vote-splitting.

== Notes ==
Donald G. Saari has published various works that mathematically analyse positional voting electoral systems. The fundamental method explored in his analysis is the Borda count.
