= Vote management =

Strategic voting system

Vote allocation or vote management is a type of strategic voting most common in countries with semi-proportional representation systems like the single non-transferable vote as well as malapportioned forms of proportional representation based on small districts (such as those often used together with the single transferable vote).

== Election format ==
In this system, voters were asked to vote for a party candidate based on items such as their day of birthday so as to evenly distribute votes. In districts where a party was running two candidates, males were sometimes asked to vote for one candidate and females for another to ensure even distribution.

This system was also practiced in Japan and South Korea, where the SNTV system was used.

Hong Kong political parties started to adopt this strategy after 2000 to overcome the effect of the largest remainder system with Hare quota combined with small constituencies (5- to 8-member in 2008).

== Single transferable vote ==
Two vote management systems exist in STV. Vote equalisation works for all systems except those that allow group voting (above the line voting). The other method, party designated transfer, only works for systems that allow group voting. A party employing a vote equalisation strategy would attempt to ensure that all its candidates obtain an equal number of first preference votes, in the hope that transfers from candidates of other parties eliminated early in the count will lead to the election of an increased number of its candidates.

For example, in an election for 3 seats, 2 parties (A and C) present two candidates and a third party B presents a single candidate. All party A voters prefer party B to party C. All party C voters prefer party B to party A. All party B voters prefer party C to party A. The following 1000 votes are cast:

220: A1 > A2 > B
200: A2 > A1 > B
190: B > C1 > C2
250: C1 > C2 > B
140: C2 > C1 > B

The quota is 250. C2 is eliminated first and candidates A1, B and C1 are elected.

If party C distributes its vote equally between its two candidates for example:

220: A1 > A2 > B
200: A2 > A1 > B
190: B > C1 > C2
195: C1 > C2 > B
195: C2 > C1 > B

B is eliminated first and candidates A1, C1 and C2 are elected. By equalizing the distribution of its vote party C wins an additional seat.

Evidence from Ireland indicates that this form of vote management has been attempted on a number of occasions. To work, vote equalization requires accurate information about voting intentions and party strengths and also the active cooperation of the voters themselves. If a party misjudges the situation a vote equalization strategy can go badly wrong. For example, in the 2003 elections to the Northern Ireland Assembly, a vote management strategy by Sinn Féin in West Belfast intended to replace a Social Democratic and Labour Party member with a Sinn Féin member led instead to the election of a member of the Democratic Unionist Party, a party extremely hostile to Sinn Féin.

The party designated transfer system of vote management is applicable only to systems that allow group voting. Under group voting, a voter places a "1" next to their first choice of party list. Their vote then transfers down the party list in an order designated by the party and then to the lists of other parties in an order predetermined by the voter's first choice party. The published lists that show the designated transfers can be long and complicated and can effectively disguise who an "above the line" vote is likely to end electing.

An example of the use of this strategy is provided by the 2004 Australian Senate election in Tasmania. The Liberal and Labor parties and an independent Labor candidate designated that their above-the-line vote should transfer to the Family First party in preference to the Green party. Had all voters in Tasmania cast "above the line" votes, the Green party candidate, who obtained almost a quota of first preference votes, would have lost to a candidate of the little supported Family First party.
