= Scabs =

Scabs might refer to:

- Scabs (musician), drummer for Frankenstein Drag Queens from Planet 13
- Derogatory nickname for strikebreaker

== See also ==
- Scab (disambiguation)
