= Strategic nomination =

Election strategy

Strategic nomination refers to the entry of a candidate into an election with the intention of changing the ranking of other candidates. The name is an echo of ‘tactical voting’ and is intended to imply that it is the candidates rather than the voters who are seeking to manipulate the result in a manner unfaithful to voters’ true preferences.

The same effect may occur even if candidates are not nominated with this thought in mind. Depending on the voting system being used, the addition of extra candidates with similar constituencies may either split away votes and hurt their combined prospects (in plurality voting systems), or it may concentrate votes in favor of the overrepresented constituencies (in positional voting systems).

Strategic nomination may also be employed to confuse voters by running candidates with similar names to a major candidate. This can be seen as a type of vote-splitting, but could have some effect even in otherwise robust methods if some voters vote for a fake candidate instead of the real candidate. An Indian election in 2014 provides an example, where Bharatiya Janata Party candidate Chandu Sahu found himself facing ten independent candidates sharing his name.

== Independence of irrelevant alternatives ==
Strategic nomination consists of manipulating a feature of voting systems which lies in their lacking the property of ‘independence of irrelevant alternatives’. Arrow's impossibility theorem shows that this property is inconsistent with others with more compelling claims to acceptance, and in consequence all seriously proposed voting systems are vulnerable in principle to strategic nomination.

In the limited case in which votes are cast according to positions on a political spectrum, voting systems which satisfy the Condorcet criterion also satisfy the median voter theorem which protects them against strategic manipulation. Other voting systems remain vulnerable. An example in the Borda count article shows how that system can be subverted by nominating candidates on one side of a political spectrum.

== Independence of clones ==
In order to simplify the issue, academic attention sometimes focuses on a specific kind of strategic nomination: the kind that involves clones. Clones in this context are candidates between whom every voter is indifferent. They will be tied in every ballot if the voting system allows ties, and will otherwise be consecutive.

It is desirable for the outcome of an election to be essentially unaffected by the addition or removal of clones. Adding or removing a clone candidate should only change the winner if the old winner, the new winner, and the candidate added or removed are all clones of each other. A voting system that satisfies this criterion is considered "independent of clones". Independence of clones was first formulated by Nicolaus Tideman.

== Types of strategic nomination ==
1. Vote-splitting happens when adding similar or clone candidates decreases the chance of any of them winning, also known as a spoiler effect. Methods that are vulnerable to this include the plurality voting system and two-round runoff voting.
2. Teaming happens when adding more candidates actually helps the chances of any of them winning, as can occur in Borda counts.
3. Crowding happens when adding candidates affects the outcome of an election without either helping or harming the chances of their factional group, but instead affecting another group. This can occur in Copeland's method.
