= U.S. Wheat and Barley Scab Initiative =

The U.S. Wheat and Barley Scab Initiative was founded in 1998. The Initiative's goal is to develop as quickly as possible effective control measures that minimize the threat of Fusarium head blight (scab), including the reduction of mycotoxins, to the producers, processors, and consumers of wheat and barley. Eight-six scientists from 24 universities and the USDA-ARS participate in a wide range of research projects aimed at achieving this goal. It is based in East Lansing, Michigan and is associated with Michigan State University and the University of Kentucky.
