= Proportional representation in the United States =

Multi-winner electoral system in the United States

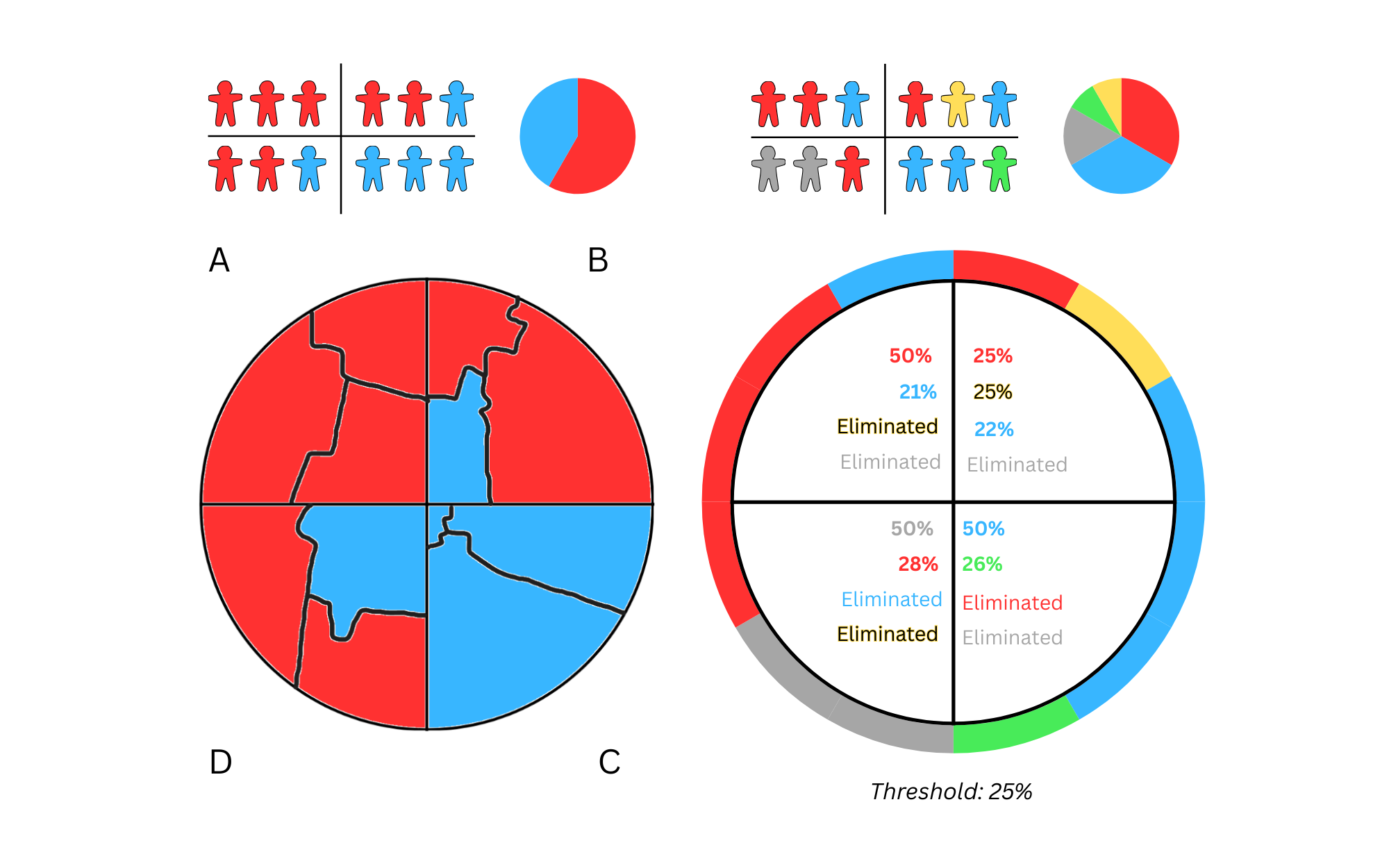
On the left is a hypothetical distribution of 12 single-member United States House seats in four states (A-D). On the right is a theoretical distribution of seats in the same states using an ungerrymandered STV system with three members per district.

Proportional representation (PR) in the United States refers to the multi-winner proportional electoral systems currently used in several cities and in the Democratic and Republican presidential primary processes.

Cities began adopting PR in the 1910s during the Progressive Era. Historically, PR elected Black candidates in an era defined by Jim Crow laws. PR was gradually repealed in the mid 20th century largely due to backlash to racial and minority political party representation.

Since the 2010s, several electoral reform groups have advocated for the use of proportional representation to elect member of Congress, instead of the current winner-take-all plurality system. PR advocates often see proportional electoral reform as a way to achieve more representation for women and African Americans in Congress, a way to depolarize the American political system, and a way to increase political participation and turnout. Opponents often claim ranked systems, such as STV, are unfair or confusing. The debate over whether to introduce PR, what form to introduce, and in which races is ongoing.

== Background ==
=== Definitions ===
Proportional representation is achieved by any electoral system under which subgroups of an electorate are reflected proportionately in the elected body. There are multiple systems for this. The main ones include:

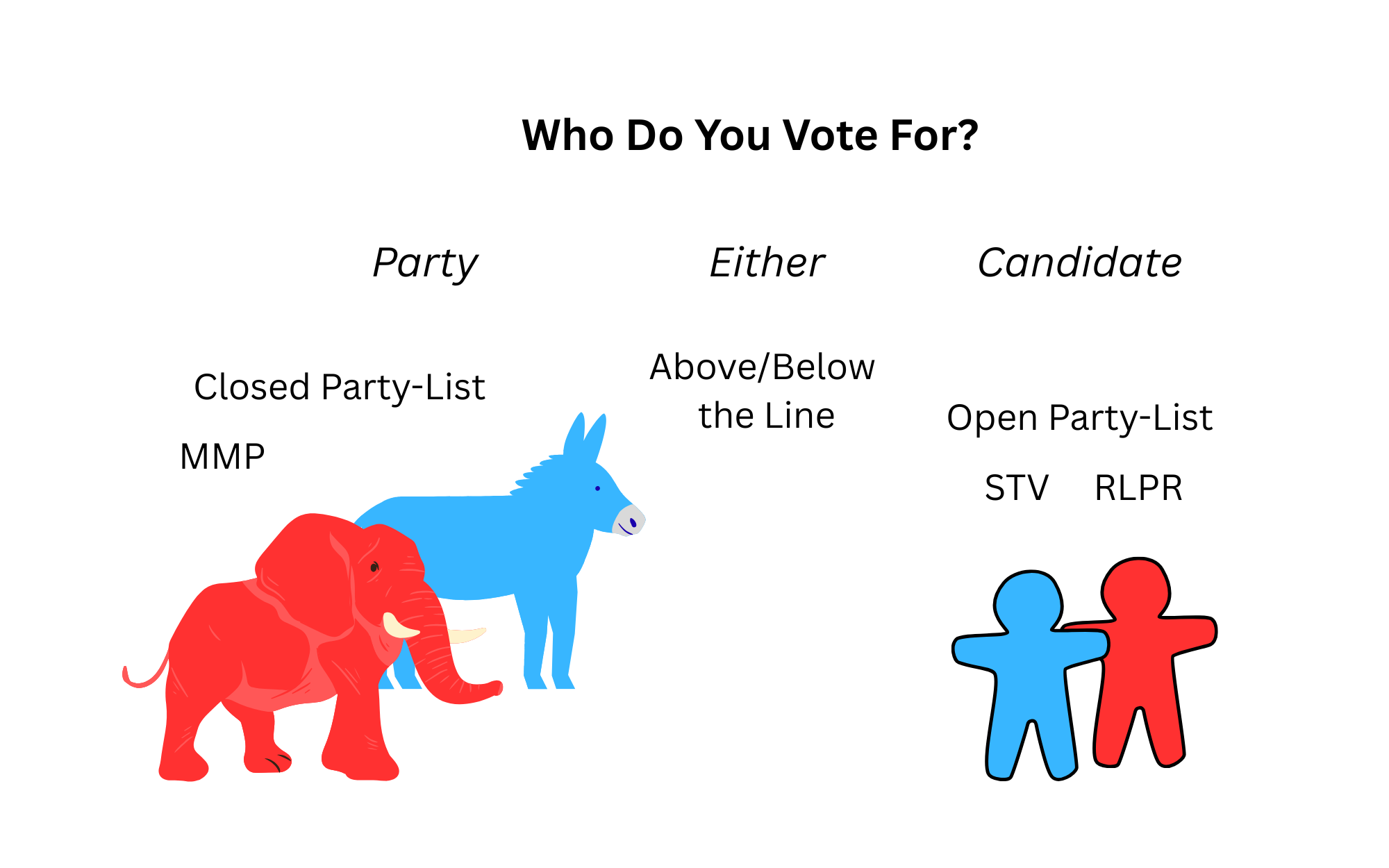
PR systems vary in how voters choose who represents them. In some systems, people vote for parties, and in others, people vote for candidates. Currently, voters in all US elections vote for candidates, not parties.

- Party-list: If a party wins 20% of the vote, it wins 20% of the seats. There are two main forms (open-list and closed-list) of party candidate nominations. Ranked-list proportional representation (RLPR), a party list system with ranked-choice voting (RCV) to determine party list order, has also been proposed in the US but has never been used. Spare vote, considered but not adopted in Germany and New Zealand, could also be used for states with high thresholds.
- Single transferable vote (STV): As a combination of RCV and PR, voters rank a number of candidates and multiple candidates are elected. Electoral thresholds are typically 1/(n+1) where n is the number of seats up for election (i.e. if there are 4 seats, the threshold would be 20%). Surplus votes are transferred to subsequent rankings. STV does not require political parties. In partisan elections, parties exercise varying control over nominations. Above-the-line voting used in the Australian Senate allows voters to rank party lists or rank candidates below the line.
- Mixed-member proportional (MMP): This system combines single-winner geographic districts with at-large "compensatory" seats added to make the seat count proportional to the vote count. MMP retains single-member districts, SMDs, (unlike party-list and STV) but allows for PR in the overall body. MMP's SMDs could use ranked-choice voting but not STV (which requires multiple winners).

The presidential primary nomination process is most similar to party-list, and all cities that have enacted PR have used single transferable vote. MMP has not been used in the United States, but it is occasionally suggested by PR activists.

MMP's compensatory seats may be unconstitutional at the federal level due to a requirement in Article I Section 2 of the US Constitution that congressmembers must be elected by states. Other forms of PR likely would be constitutional and would only require a bill in Congress.

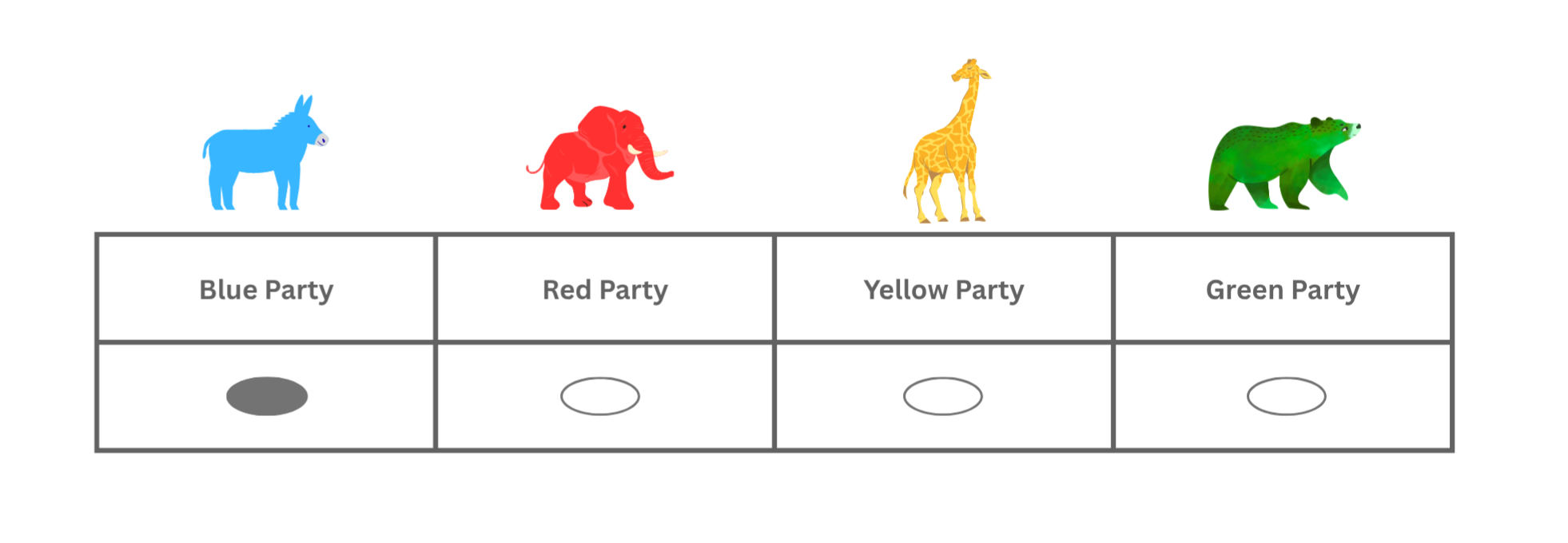
Closed-list PR

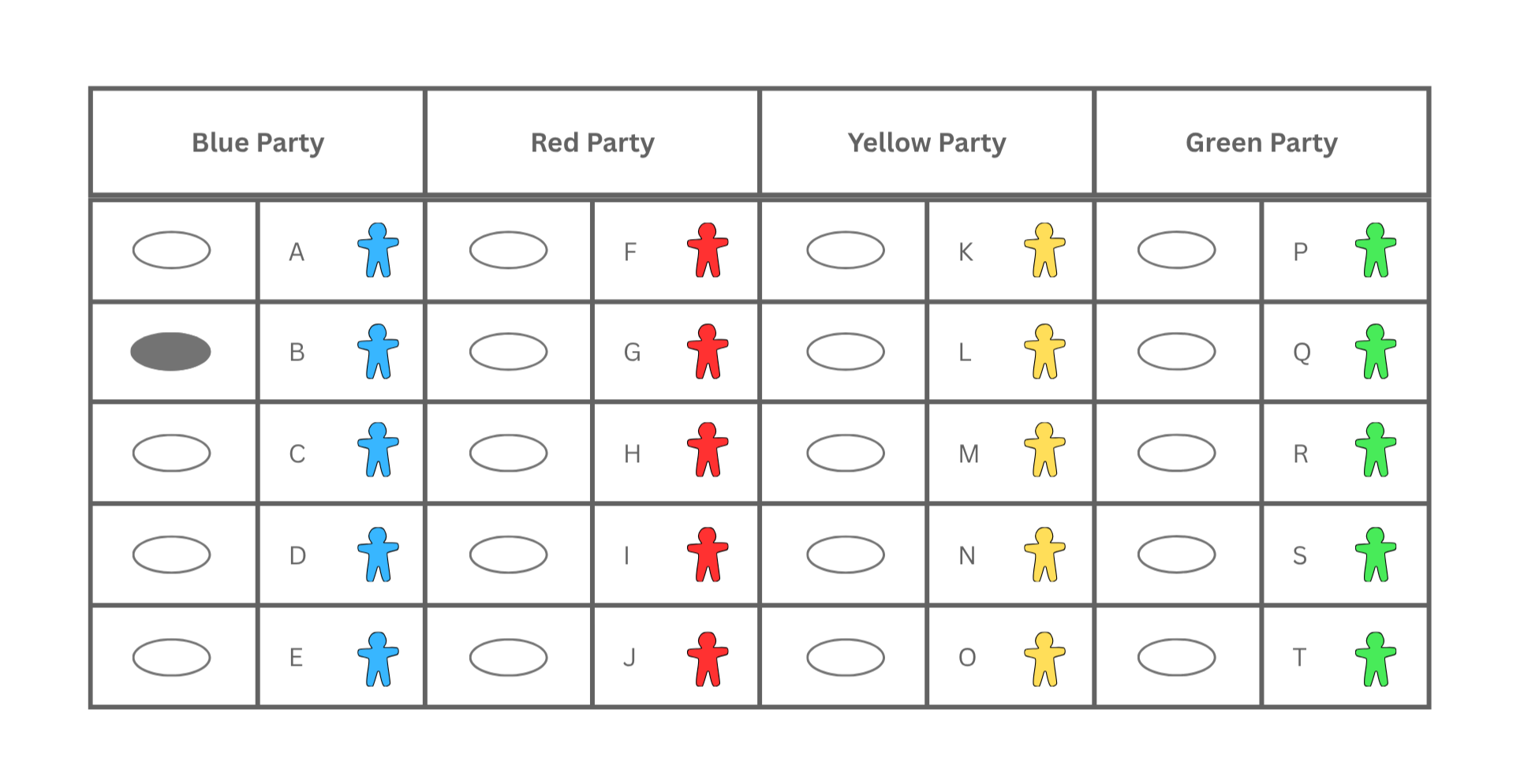
Open-list PR

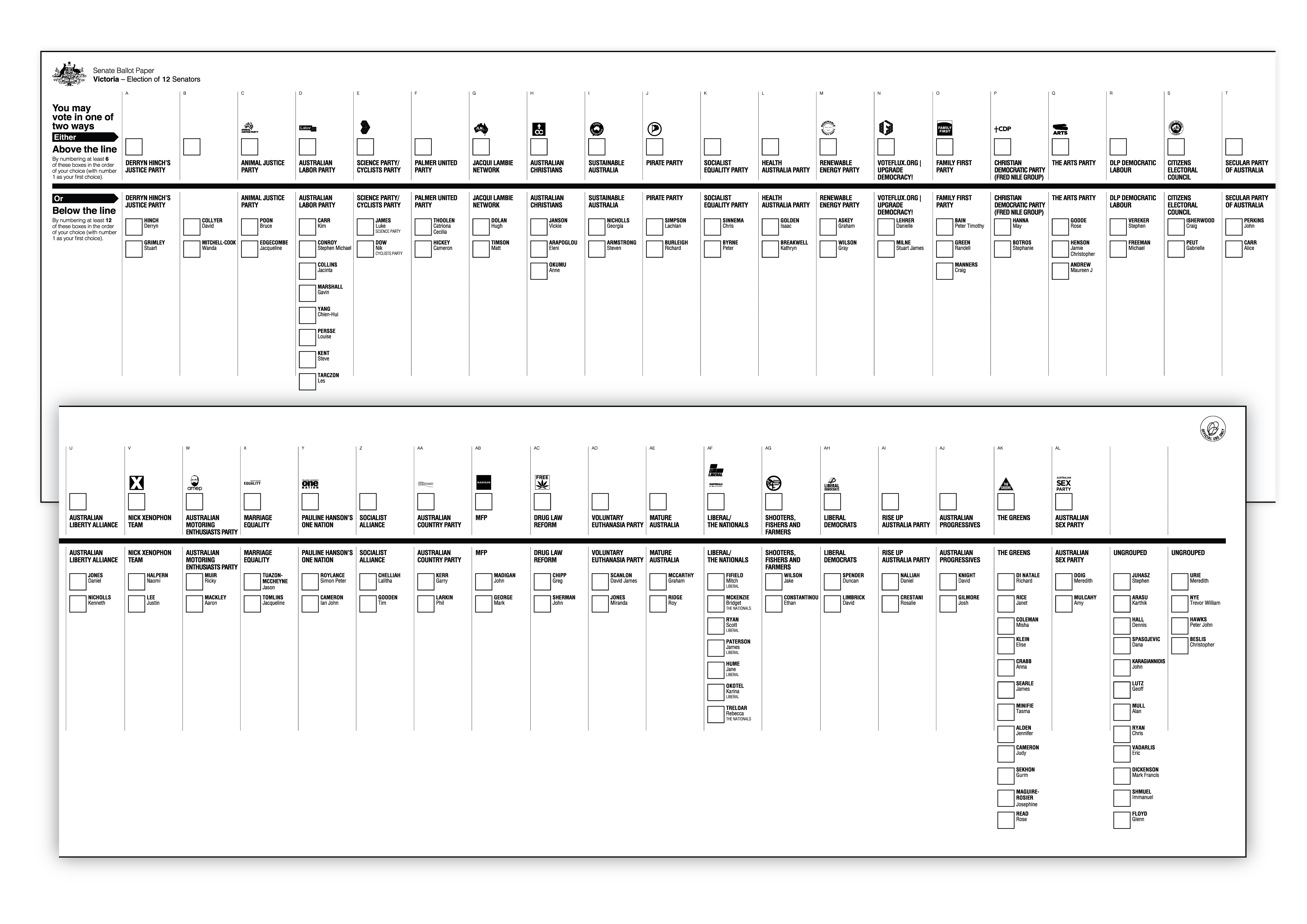
Above/below the line voting

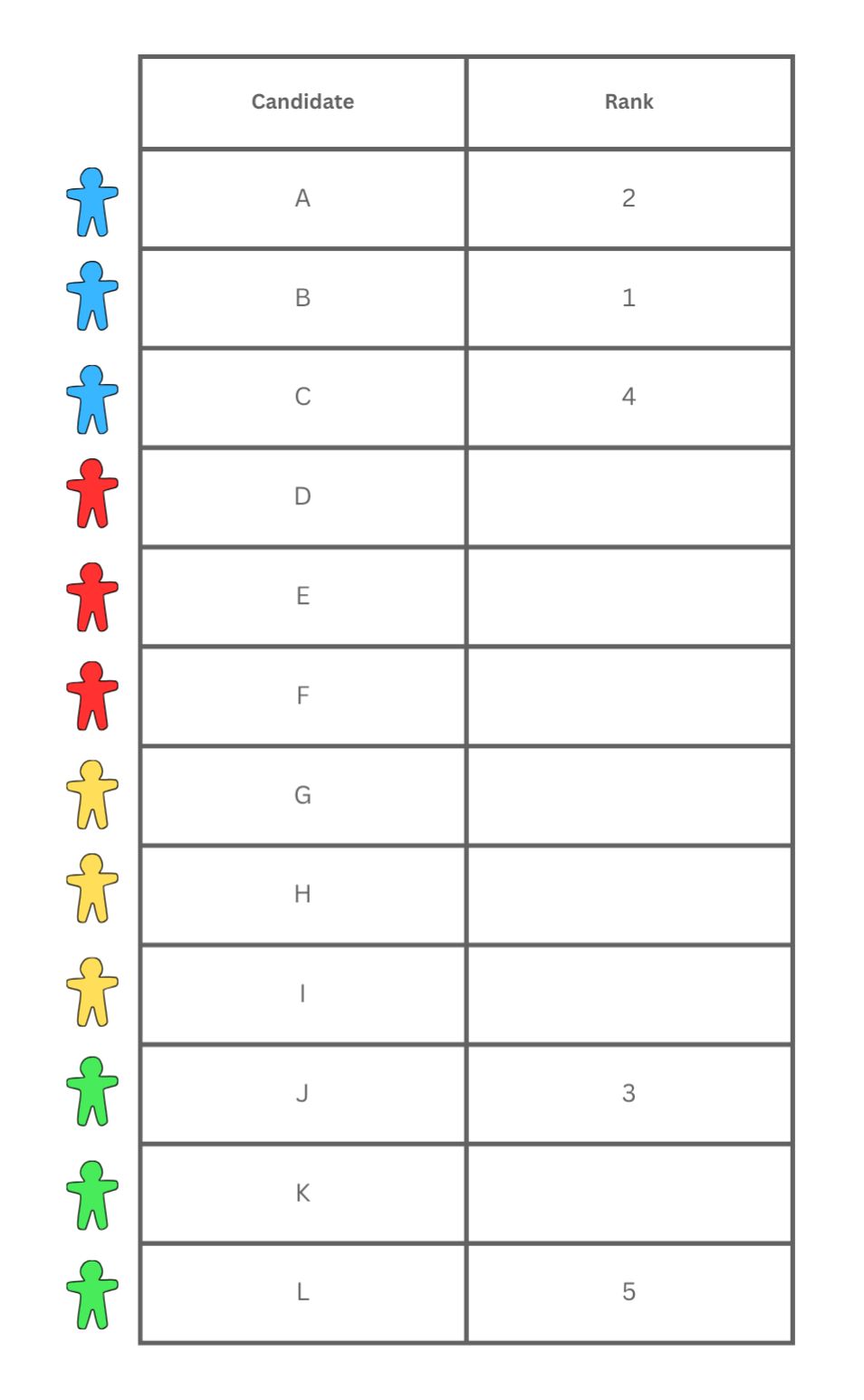
STV

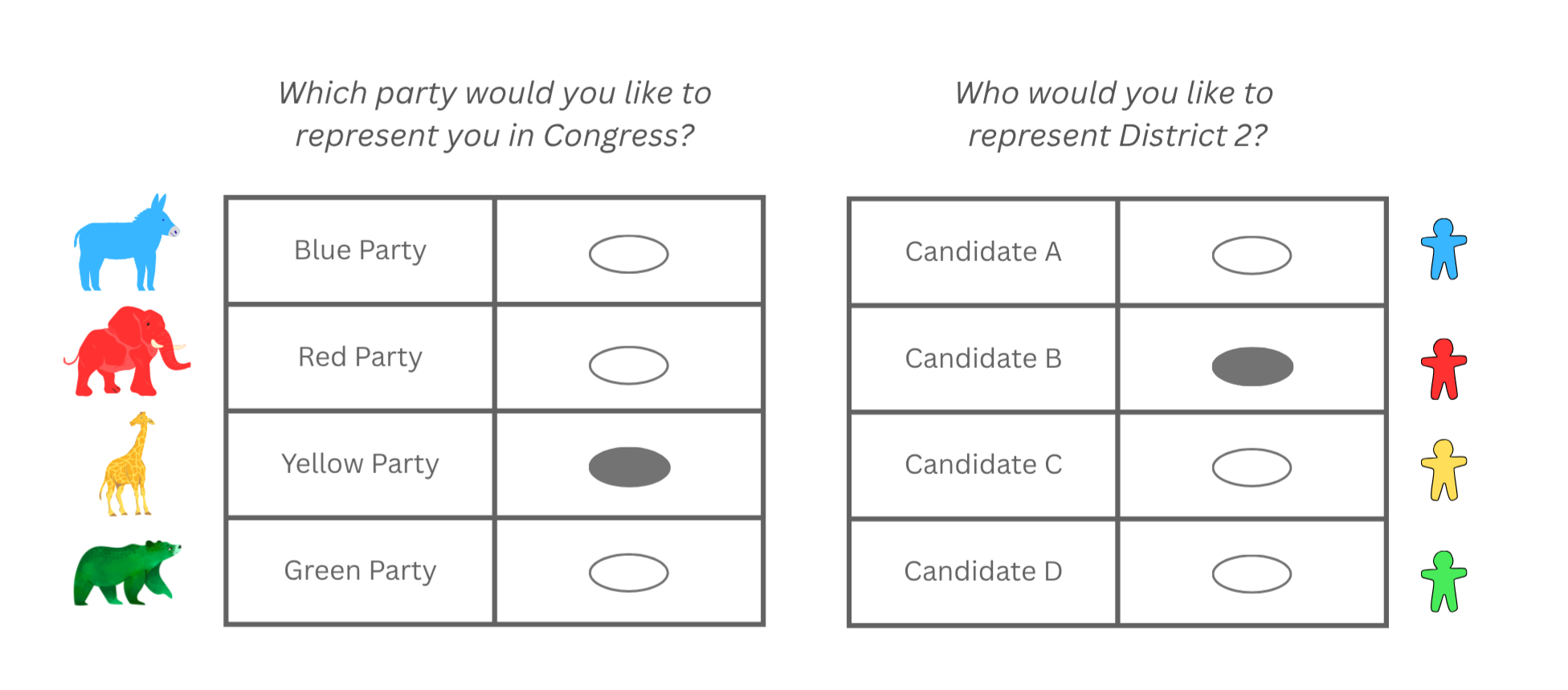
MMP

=== Electoral structure ===
Multiple states ban ranked-choice voting for local elections, which prevents the use of single transferable vote (STV), but not necessarily party-list or MMP systems. Municipalities' ability to alter electoral systems depends on home rule laws. In Minnesota, cities are either statutory or charter cities, and only charter cities are currently able to implement any ranked-choice voting systems.

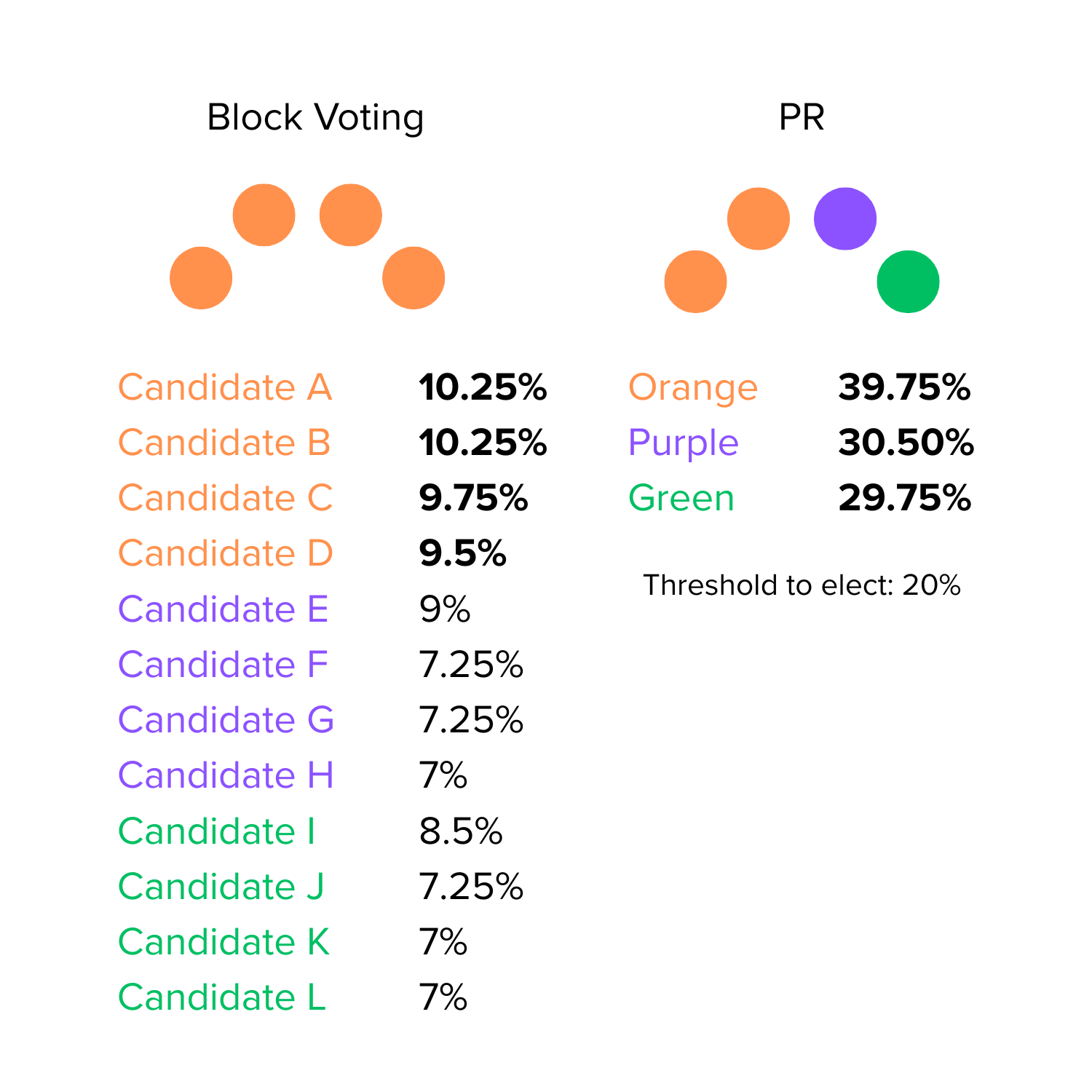
Many cities in the United States use block voting, which allows a voter to cast one vote per open seat. Since block voting is a FPTP election and not proportional (as in party-list on the right), it typically elects a landslide slate of candidates.

Most United States House of Representatives seats are elected by plurality vote (the candidate receiving the most votes wins). House seats in Maine and Alaska use ranked-choice voting (RCV) instead of plurality voting. Since the late 1960s, all House congressional districts have been single-member districts due to the Uniform Congressional District Act (UCDA). The current first-past-the-post (FPTP) system does not require a proportional number of seats in relation to votes, and seat allocation may vary widely from votes cast.

Since 1913, after the ratification of the 17th Amendment, US senators have been elected by plurality vote in at-large, statewide elections. Some states use runoffs or RCV instead to elect senators by a majority instead of a plurality. According to a 1992 DOJ memorandum opinion, Senate races must be at-large and may not be broken into two single-member district races.

The president of the United States cannot be elected directly via proportional representation, since the seat is inherently single-winner. In parliamentary systems, the legislature, which may be proportionally elected, chooses the prime minister. The United States is a presidential system with a separation of the legislature and executive. Many Latin American countries elect their legislatures through party-list proportional representation and hold a direct popular vote for president, such as Peru, Chile, and Costa Rica.

== History ==
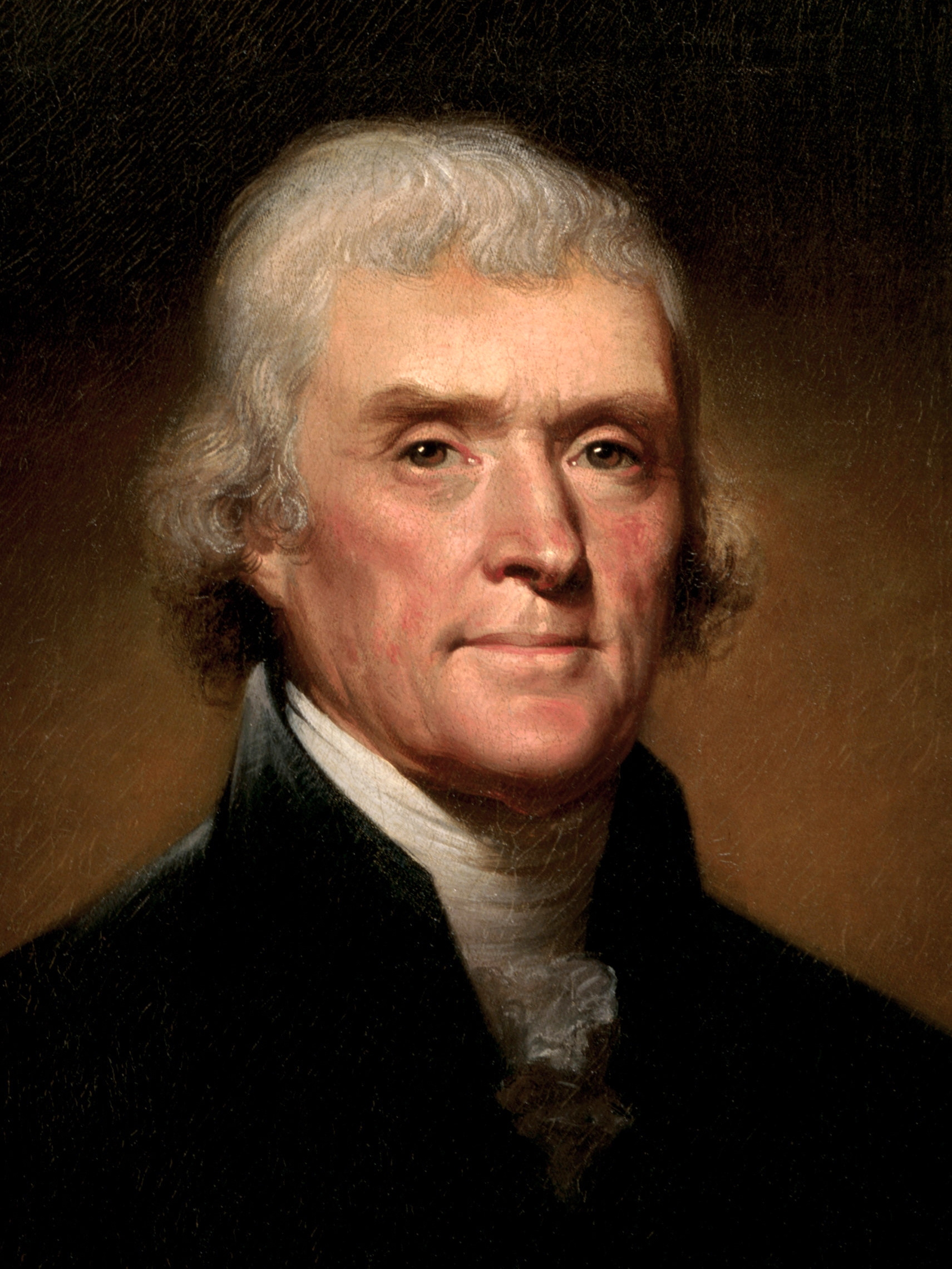
Thomas Jefferson invented the D'Hondt method, which is a common method for determining seat remainders in PR systems today.

=== Founding ===
When the United States Constitution was written, modern PR had not been invented (STV was invented in 1819 and first used in 1856). According to Robert Dahl in How Democratic Is the American Constitution?, winner-take-all was the "only system [the founders] knew." Thomas Jefferson invented a formula for apportioning seats in 1792 (D'Hondt method), now widely used in PR seat calculations, but it was used for House apportionment, not for party proportional representation.

=== 19th century ===
The earliest known essay for proportional representation in the United States was written in 1844 by printmaker Thomas Gilpin and dedicated to the American Philosophical Society. The article argued for "minority representation" (Note: "Minority representation" as used by 19th century electoral reform advocates referred to minority political parties or opinions, not ethnic minorities, and can be seen as a synonymous with "proportional representation.") in Philadelphia elections in a manner that resembles contemporary party-list systems. Gilpin suggested a Native American party could form under PR as a part of a larger coalition.

In 1867, Simon Sterne presented a proportional representation system to elect members of the New York state legislature during the state's constitutional convention on behalf of the Personal Representation (Note: Early reformers called proportional representation "personal representation" after Thomas Hare's nonpartisan reform ideas during his invention of STV.) Society of New York. His proposed system would have used a unique "proxy" system with flexible number of legislators and disproportionate voting power among representatives. His proposals were not adopted.

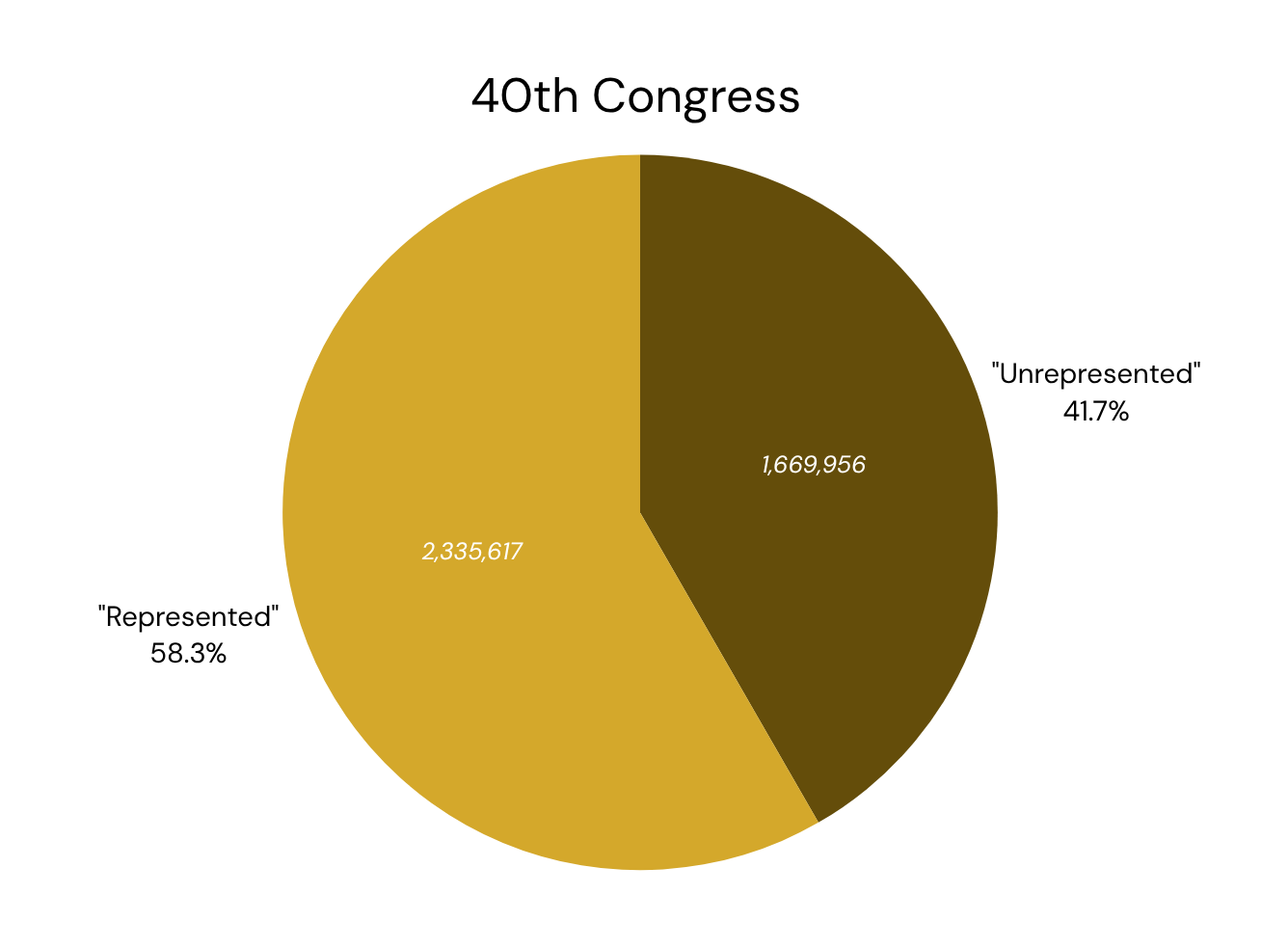
41.7% of votes in the 1866-1867 United States House of Representatives elections did not elect a candidate, according to Salem Dutcher in his 1872 analysis. The 41st and 42nd Congresses had similar percentages.

Also in 1867, Senator Charles Buckalew gave two speeches, one on the Senate floor, in support of using cumulative voting, a semi-proportional system, to elect Congress and electors in the Electoral College. In March 1869, Buckalew argued in a report passed by the Select Committee on Representative Reform that the plurality system contributed to the Civil War, since, as he saw it, "Dispersed, unorganized, unrepresented, without due voice and power, [Union men] could interpose no effectual resistance to secession and to civil war." His semi-proportional proposals were not adopted. Buckalew's writings and speeches were compiled in a book in 1872 titled "Proportional representation". The book also documented contemporary PR efforts, including the single transferable vote.

Senator James Mitchell Ashley, a member of the radical Republicans and author of the Thirteenth Amendment, introduced a Constitutional amendment in 1869 that would have required that whenever more than one representative is elected, they be elected proportionally. He preferred the single transferable vote.

=== Progressive era ===
The Progressive movement of the early 20th century advocated for a variety of electoral reforms, including proportional representation.

Populist former-Senator William A. Peffer described proportional representation as a "tenet of the People's party creed" in the Advocate in 1897. In the 1898 Populist convention in Topeka, the adopted platform stated, "We demand that the initiative and referendum be embodied in our state constitution and favor proportional representation."

Above is the share of seats after 1904 United States House of Representatives elections. Republicans won 251 seats (65% of total) despite winning 54.58% of the vote.

John R Commons argued in Proportional Representation that the seat results would be much different if the seats were allocated proportionally.

Famous reformers such as John R. Commons advocated for proportional representation to undermine gerrymandering and to elect Black politicians.

Proportional representation cannot be secured where but one candidate is elected in a district. He is the representative of the majority and not of all. The single-membered district system, which is almost universal in the election of representatives, is an historical accident, and not a rational device for representation or modern lines. In feudal and colonial times, when it was adopted, it happened that each organized interest lived by itself in a given territory. Each guild of handworkers had its own ward in the town, and therefore the alderman of the shoe-makers happened to be the alderman of the shoe-makers’ ward. Suffrage was limited to those who belonged to the guild. Also the farmers were only farm owners and not farm laborers. Now, when suffrage is universal, ward and district lines have lost their meaning.

— John R. Commons, Proportional Representation (1902)

Signature-gathering petition packet campaigning for PR in Oregon, 1908

Judge McGinn speech for proportional representation for the Oregon legislature, 1910

In 1908, the People's Power League of Oregon helped place a bill authorizing the use of proportional representation on the ballot under the newly created citizen-initiative process. Voters in Oregon passed the initiative, allowing the legislature or other bodies in Oregon to implement proportional representation. The amendment read partially, "...provision may be made by law for elections by equal proportional representation of all the voters for every office which is filled by the election of two or more persons whose official duties, rights and powers are equal and concurrent." The amendment is still in effect.

In 1910, a ballot initiative requiring the use of "proportional representation" for the Oregon Legislative Assembly failed but garnered 45.49% of the vote. The proposed system would have given voters one vote in a statewide election where the top sixty vote-getters were elected. This system most closely resembles limited voting, a semi-proportional (Note: The term semi-proportional was not widespread yet, so many semi-proportional systems were advocated alongside true proportional systems in the early 1900s.) system.

==== Pivot to cities ====
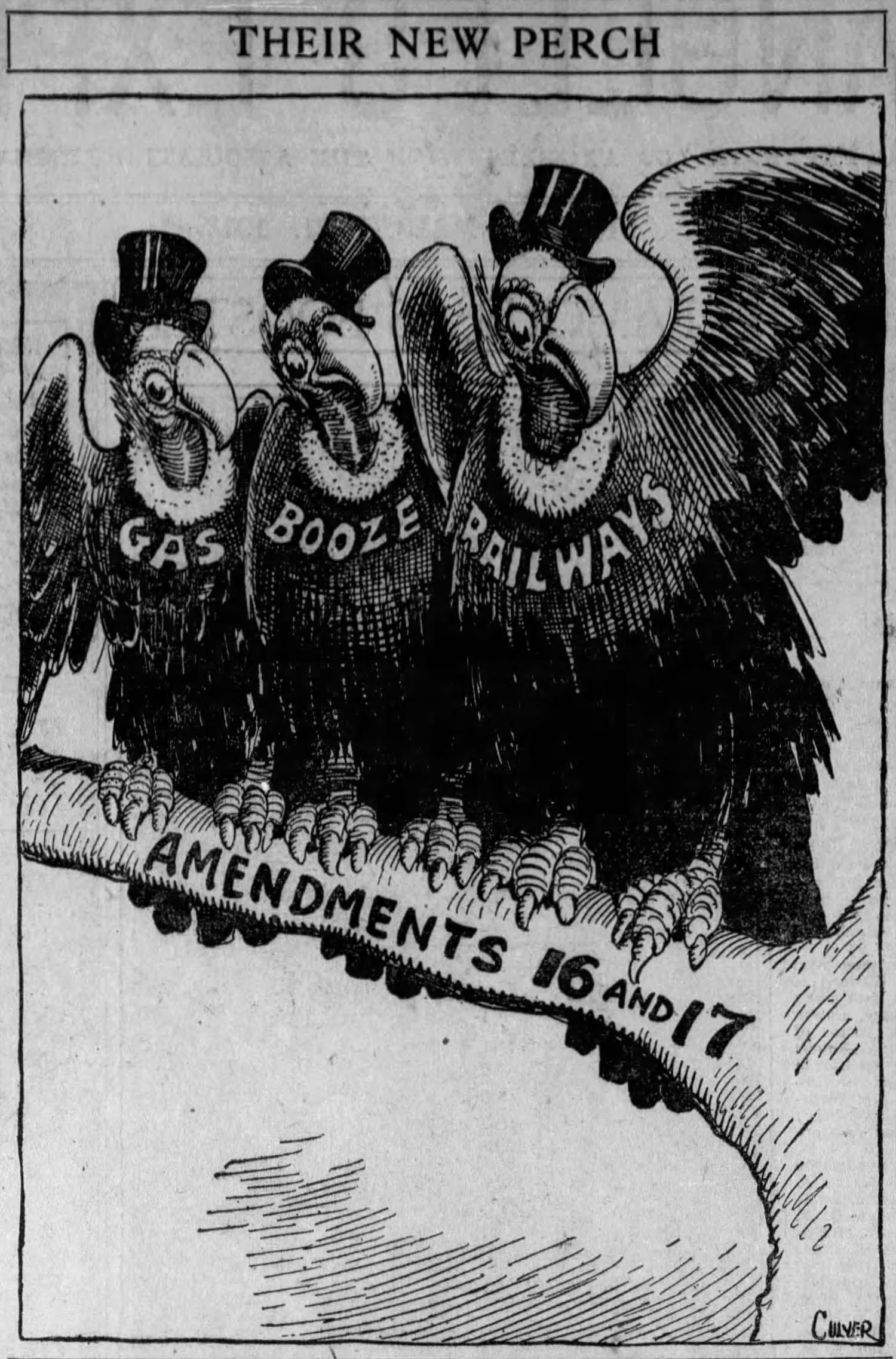
Comic depicting the single-member-district plan (amendment 17) in LA as the "perch" of the gas, alcohol, and railway industries

In 1913, an initiative to elect representatives via open party-list proportional representation in Los Angeles failed, receiving 48.2% of the vote. The campaign was marked with infighting between socialists who wanted to expand their representation and progressive Republicans who wanted to undermine party influence. A chunk of the progressives were also hesitant to ally with anti-capitalists after a bitter election two years prior.

The Proportional Representation League advocated for the use of single transferable vote, a ranked-choice, proportional vote system, in cities in the 1890s and the early 20th century. The league preferred at-large proportional representation as opposed to district models. In 1932, the Proportional Representation League merged into the National Municipal League, now known as the National Civic League. The National Municipal League endorsed a move toward the city manager plan and STV in 1914. In Ashtabula, the transition to a city manager plan and PR were seen to go together, as there was concern that a plurality voting system would result in only one party appointing the city manager.

According to Jack Santucci, a Georgetown University professor, when city charter reform occurred, most cities chose plurality at-large (block voting), but cities that chose STV instead had intraparty factions (who wanted to weaken party nominations) that allied with minority parties to pass PR.

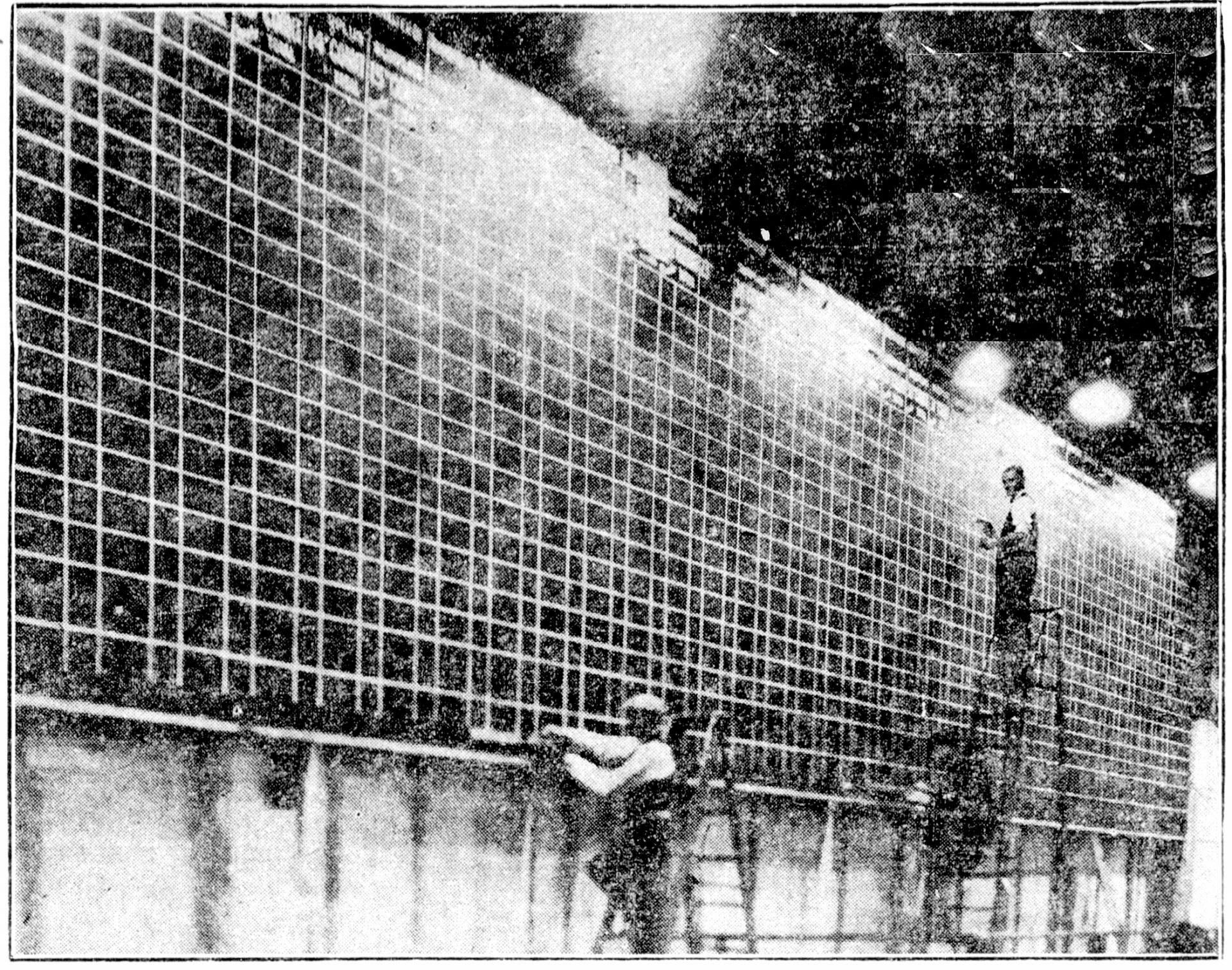
During the 1925 Cincinnati City Council election, vote tallies were tabulated on a large blackboard. Spreadsheet software had not yet been invented and computers were not involved in election tabulations.

Between 1915 and 1962, 22 cities used STV, including Cincinnati, Sacramento, and most notably New York City. The first city to use PR the US was Ashtabula, Ohio in 1915 via referendum.

On February 16, 1915, Congressional hearings were held on Warren W. Bailey's bill to allow any state with three or more representatives in the US House to use proportional representation for their Congressional delegations. The bill would have allowed for the optional use of open-list proportional representation and would have allowed parties to hold primaries to determine the list. Massachusetts governor David I. Walsh testified in support of the bill. The bill did not become law.

Massachusetts governor Walsh argued that the state senate would have more Democrats and Progressives (based on the 1914 governor's race) had PR been used to elect it.

Jeannette Rankin, the first woman elected to Congress, called for the use of proportional representation in state legislatures, as well as the adoption of initiative, recall, and the direct popular election for the presidency after her election in 1916.

Progressives in LA were set to vote for their preferred system, STV, in 1922, but the Supreme Court of California struck down Sacramento's STV system days before the election. The court argued the state would require a constitutional amendment to implement the system.

Kalamazoo, Michigan used PR for two elections before the Michigan Supreme Court overturned the system.

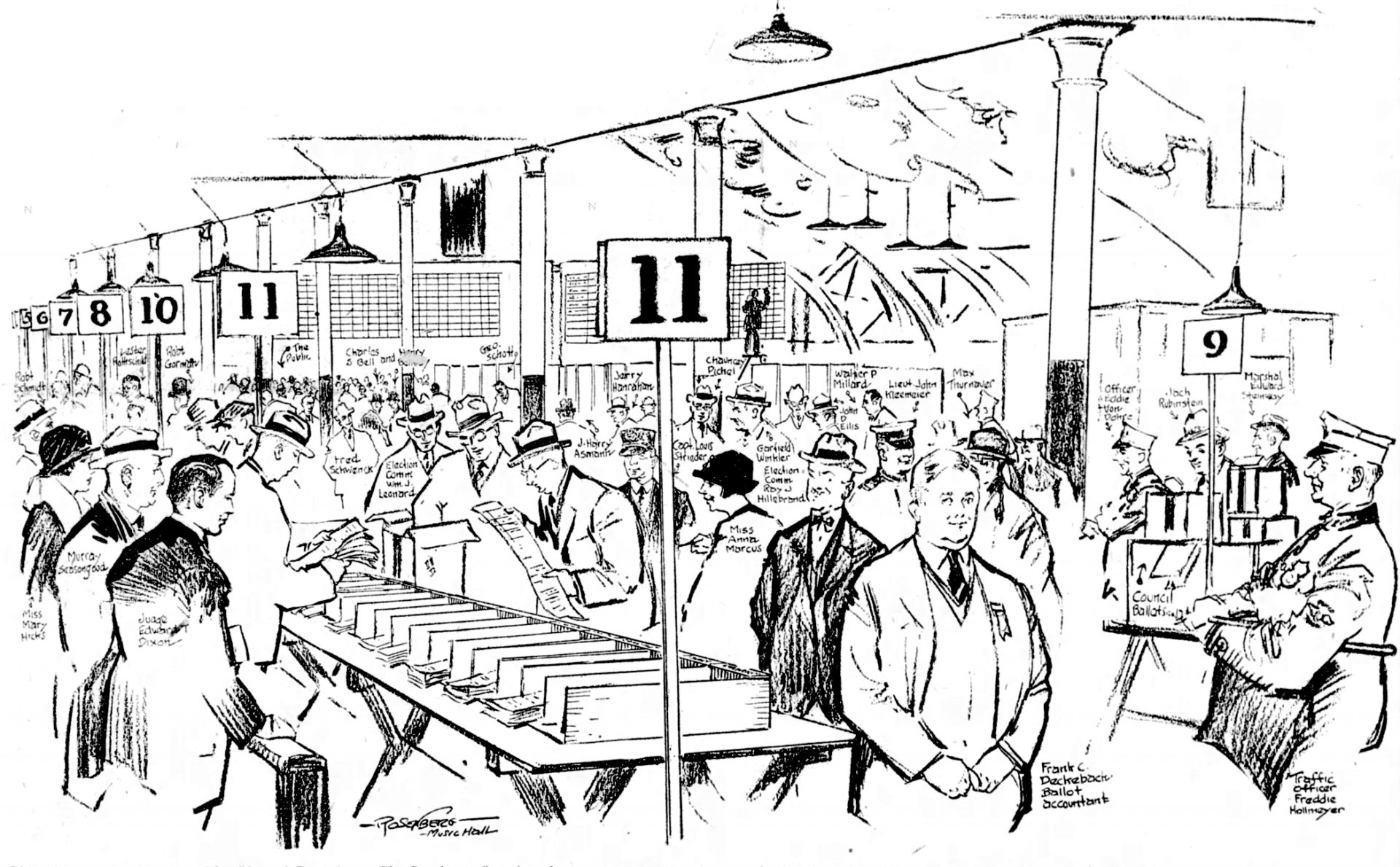
Before ranked-choice voting software, second choice tabulation had to be done by hand. This newspaper illustration depicts STV tabulation in Cincinnati Music Hall for the 1925 City Council election.

In Cincinnati, the City Charter Committee was formed to pass a citywide ballot initiative to institute PR without Republican machine support. Cincinnati's 1925 City Council election had a threshold of 10% of the vote (including after transfers) for a candidate to be elected to one of the nine seats. This required a candidate to receive 11,974 votes. Candidates who were endorsed by the two main factions (Republicans and the Charter) won their races in 1927. The Republicans performed best in the 1929 election after endorsing nine candidates for the city council.

In January 1929, Representative Victor L. Berger introduced a bill to elect the US House of Representatives by proportional representation. The bill did not pass, and Berger died in August the same year in a trolley accident.

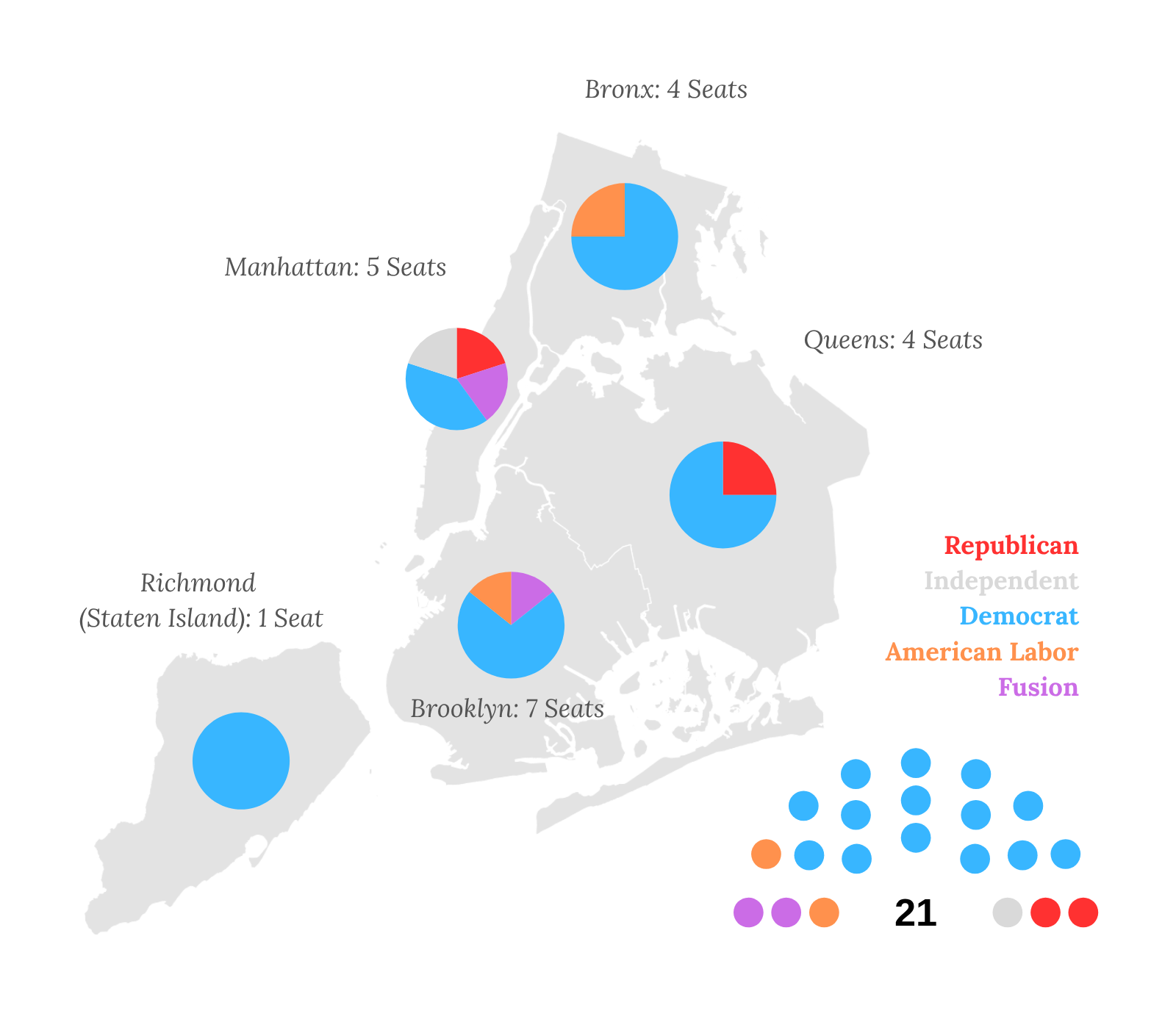
Results of the 1939 New York City council election by borough using STV.

In the wake of the Walker scandal, Fiorello La Guardia advocated for a successful referendum to replace gerrymandered districts with STV. New York City's first election using PR was in 1937. The city used a quota system, wherein each borough was entitled to one councilmember for every 75,000 votes cast (plus one more for a remainder of 50,000 or more). Ballot guides were widely distributed during the election, and the system was credited for making it easier to prevent vote tampering and a having a higher percentage of votes going to elect a candidate than the previous single-member district system.

The New York state legislature attempted to end NYC's PR system via ballot initiative as a part of the 1938 New York constitutional convention, but it was rejected with 71.25% of the vote opposed to the measure.

=== Decline in 1940s-1960s ===
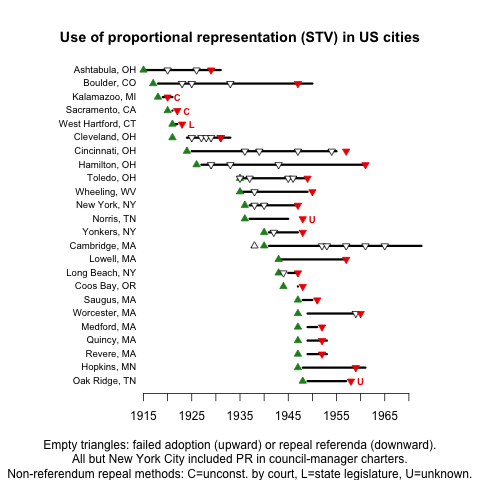
History of adoption and repeals of PR from 1915-1960s

Proportional representation fell out of favor and began to be repealed after racial and political minorities began to win seats. Initially, most repeals came from court challenges or state repeals without input from local voters. Fear of Black mayors and councilmembers, as well as the Second Red Scare, led to successful referendums against PR.

In his book More Parties or No Parties, Jack Santucci argues STV struggled with vote leakage (voters ranking candidates from very different parties close to each other) and was more susceptible to repeal than party-list systems. Reformers in the 1910s held strong anti-party sentiments that conflicted with party-list systems, and the media branded party-list as "socialist," particularly during the failed 1913 Los Angeles charter campaign.

Cambridge has consistently used proportional representation since 1941—the only city from the era to do so.

=== Attempted Electoral College reforms ===
Article Two of the Constitution states "Each State shall appoint, in such Manner as the Legislature thereof may direct, a Number of Electors...", which has generally been taken to mean that changes to the way states allocate electoral votes (EVs) would have to be passed by states (via legislatures or initiatives) or by a constitutional amendment. According to McPherson v. Blacker, states have plenary power in selecting the method of appointing electors.

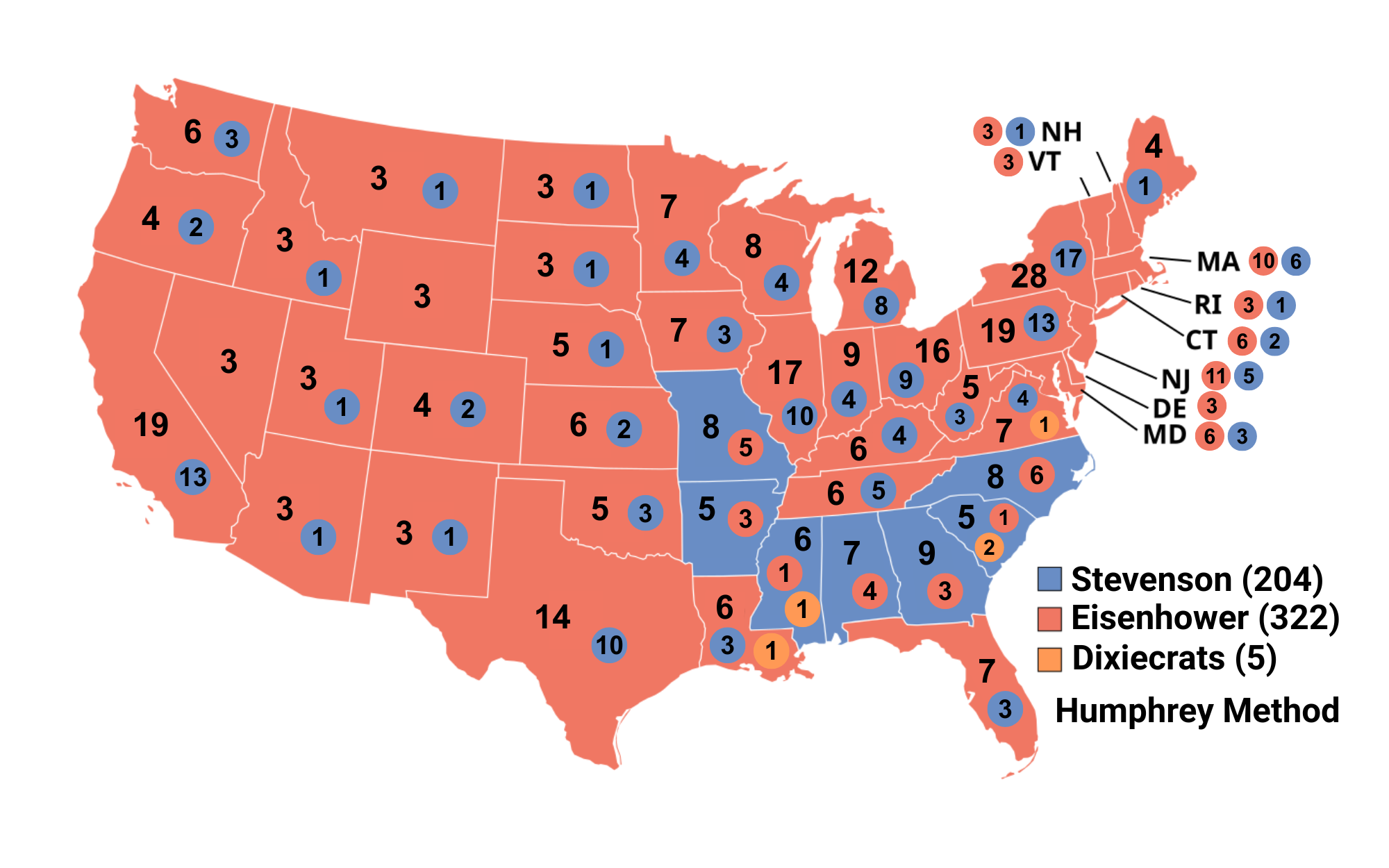
If Humphrey's method were applied to the 1956 election, it would have given Stevenson 130 more EVs (204 total), resulting in him receiving 38% of the total.

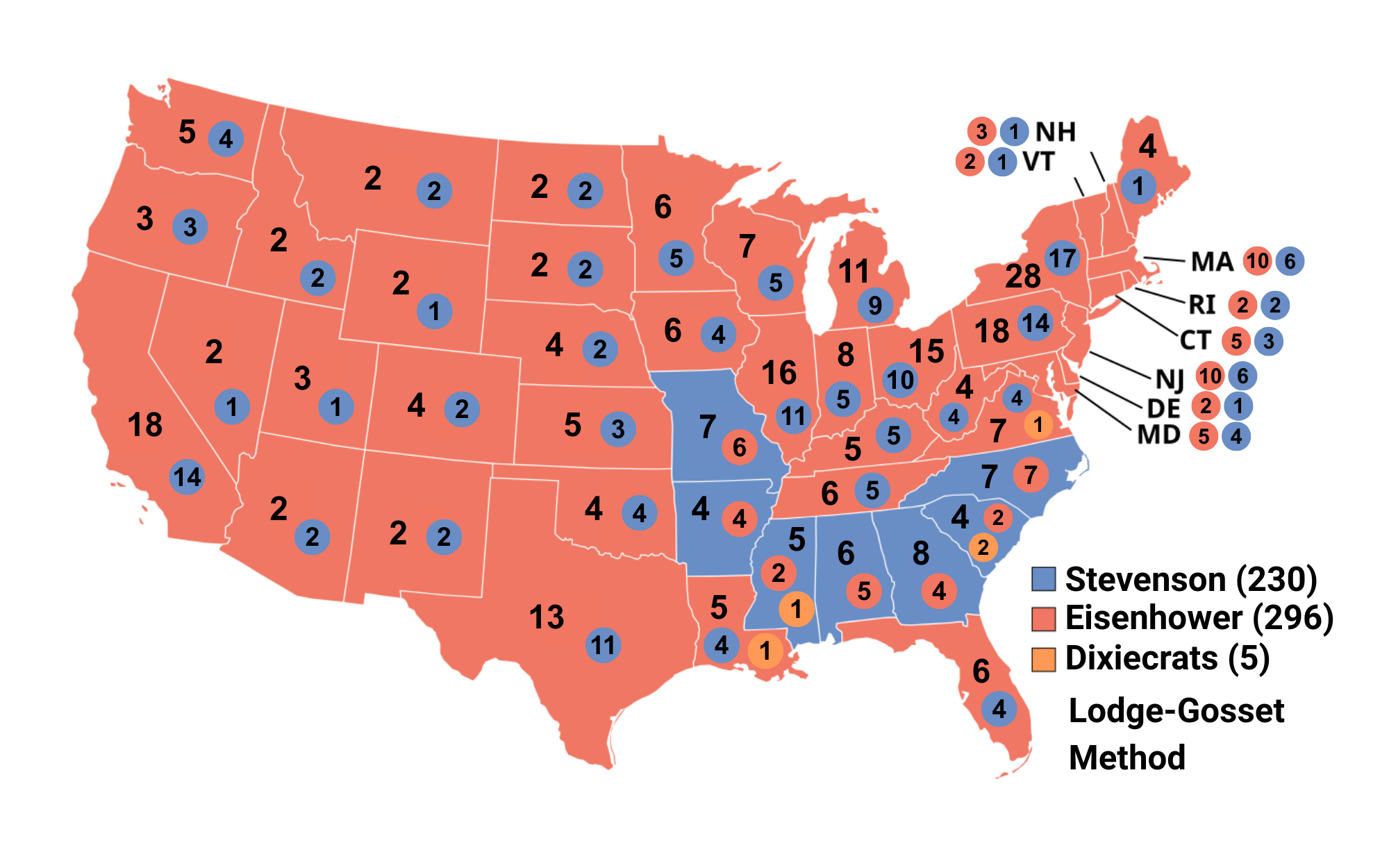
Since the Lodge-Gosset method did not award 2 EVs for statewide winners, smaller states (such as the Dakotas) would allocate more votes for non-statewide winners.

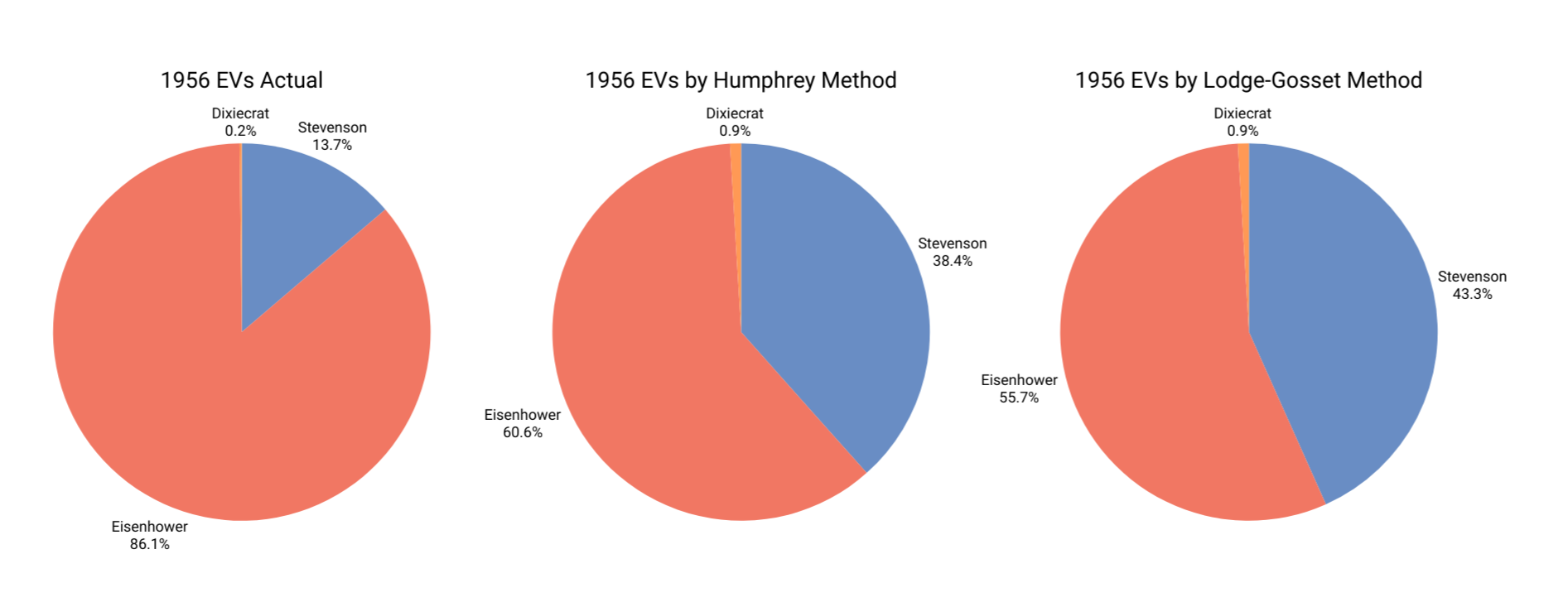
The Lodge-Gosset method would have given Stevenson in 1956 a total of 230 EVs (43% of the total), resulting in a closer match to his share of the popular vote (42%).

The Lodge-Gosset amendment was a proposed constitutional amendment that passed the Senate in 1950 that would have retained the Electoral College but require each state to allocate its electoral votes proportionally. To be elected, a presidential candidate would need to win at least 40% of the total EVs. Louis Lautier argued via the NPAA that the amendment would hurt African Americans' swaying power as an interest group in swing states, primarily due to disenfranchisement in the South (pre-Voting-Rights-Act) preventing a counterbalance in the vote for president. Journalist Walter Lippmann, preferring the Congressional district model assumed by the Founders, argued the use of PR in the electoral college would lead to the use of PR in the House of Representatives.

In early 1956, then-Senator Hubert Humphrey proposed an amendment to the Constitution in which 2 EVs would be given for the winner of a state's popular vote (96 total, before the addition of Alaska and Hawaii) and the rest (435) would be allocated proportionally according to the percentages of the nationwide vote. The proposal passed the House but not the Senate.

In 2004, voters rejected an initiated amendment to the Colorado state constitution that would have allocated its EVs proportionally with the state's popular vote and retroactively applied the system to the 2004 election occurring the same day. Major politicians from both parties (Republican Gov. Bill Owens and the two candidates in the Senate race) opposed the initiative, and opponents argued it would eliminate Colorado's then-swing-state character. One study found that had Colorado allocated its electoral votes proportionally in the previous election, the presidency could have gone to Gore (270-268) if Barbara Lett-Simmons chose not to be a faithless elector.

== Contemporary usage ==
Currently, multi-member elections for Congress are banned under the Uniform Congressional District Act. The act was intended to ban general tickets (a type of block voting (Note: Reformers in the 1910s sometimes called block voting "proportional representation" due to its election of multiple representatives, but it is now understood as a form of multi-member plurality voting since it does not ensure representation for smaller political parties.) currently used in the Electoral College) for congressional races, which had been controversial since the 1840s, but it also banned proportional systems.

=== Presidential primaries ===
Following the controversial 1968 election, the DNC created the McGovern–Fraser Commission to democratize the presidential nomination process. The commission supported using proportional representation for delegate selection and agreed with the DNC's decision to ban winner-take-all primaries.

Results of the 2020 Democratic presidential primary, which used PR (including ranked ballots)

The 2016 Republican presidential primary in Michigan used PR to select delegates.

Proportional representation is currently used to elect pledged delegates to the Democratic National Convention. Candidates must receive at least 15% of the vote to receive delegates. Proportional ranked-choice voting was used in four states in the large 2020 Democratic primary, including in Kansas, which saw an increase in turnout.

Currently, the Republican National Committee leaves delegate selection processes to the states, resulting in a variety of systems for the Republican Party presidential nomination process. Some states use proportional representation, a plurality use proportional representation with a winner-take-all trigger after a threshold is reached, and some states use a true winner-take-all system. In the 2024 Republican presidential primary elections, Nikki Haley received 19.7% of the vote and 97 delegates (4% of the total delegates).

=== Return in municipal government ===
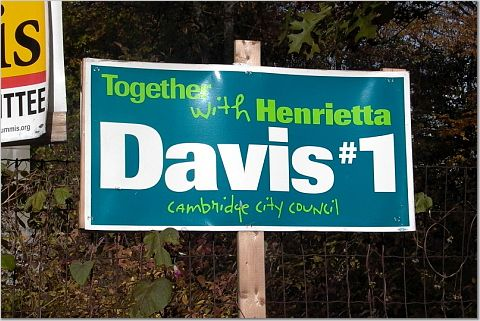
Campaign poster for Henrietta Davis from a single transferable vote election

Multiple cities use proportional representation to elect their city councils, including Portland, Minneapolis, Charlottesville, and Cambridge. Since Portland uses STV, candidates are elected when they reach a victory threshold. The result does not ensure party proportional representation due to the races being formally nonpartisan. Portland first used STV in its 2024 city council election.

Eastpointe, Michigan and Newburgh, New York transitioned to STV to settle Voting Rights Act disputes in 2017 and 2026 respectively.

Washington, D.C. uses proportional ranked-choice voting in its at-large races (two at a time in staggered terms). Unlike traditional STV, DC's system does not reallocate surplus votes. The first election using PR in DC will be in 2026.

Longmont, Colorado adopted proportional ranked-choice voting for its city council races following two successful 2026 ballot referendums.

9-winner STV city council election in Cambridge

2021 Cambridge City Council
Candidate	Round 1		Round 2		Round 3		Round 4		Round 5		Round 6		Round 7		Round 8		Round 9		Round 10		Round 11		Round 12		Round 13	
Candidate	Votes	%	Votes	%	Votes	%	Votes	%	Votes	%	Votes	%	Votes	%	Votes	%	Votes	%	Votes	%	Votes	%	Votes	%	Votes	%
Sumbul Siddiqui	4,124	18.91%	2,182	10.0%	2,182	10.0%	2,182	10.0%	2,182	10.0%	2,182	10.0%	2,182	10.0%	2,182	10.0%	2,182	10.0%	2,182	10.0%	2,182	10.0%	2,182	10.0%	2,182	10.0%
Denise Simmons	1,764	8.09%	2,088	9.57%	2,089	9.58%	2,091	9.59%	2,095	9.6%	2,103	9.64%	2,182	10.0%	2,182	10.0%	2,182	10.0%	2,182	10.0%	2,182	10.0%	2,182	10.0%	2,182	10.0%
Patricia M. Nolan	1,971	9.04%	2,143	9.82%	2,145	9.83%	2,151	9.86%	2,159	9.9%	2,167	9.93%	2,178	9.98%	2,182	10.0%	2,182	10.0%	2,182	10.0%	2,182	10.0%	2,182	10.0%	2,182	10.0%
Dennis J. Carlone	1,493	6.84%	1,544	7.08%	1,544	7.08%	1,550	7.11%	1,554	7.12%	1,560	7.15%	1,569	7.19%	1,580	7.24%	1,663	7.62%	1,702	7.8%	1,762	8.08%	2,182	10.0%	2,182	10.0%
Marc C. McGovern	1,539	7.06%	1,768	8.11%	1,773	8.13%	1,776	8.14%	1,785	8.18%	1,790	8.21%	1,834	8.41%	1,855	8.5%	1,887	8.65%	1,973	9.05%	2,055	9.42%	2,182	10.0%	2,182	10.0%
Burhan Azeem	1,379	6.32%	1,566	7.18%	1,567	7.18%	1,569	7.19%	1,570	7.2%	1,574	7.22%	1,589	7.28%	1,643	7.53%	1,743	7.99%	1,810	8.3%	1,955	8.96%	2,108	9.66%	2,182	10.0%
Alanna M. Mallon	1,220	5.59%	1,552	7.12%	1,552	7.12%	1,556	7.13%	1,562	7.16%	1,567	7.18%	1,598	7.33%	1,641	7.52%	1,713	7.85%	1,805	8.27%	1,914	8.77%	2,083	9.55%	2,182	10.0%
Quinton Y. Zondervan	1,295	5.94%	1,431	6.56%	1,432	6.56%	1,436	6.58%	1,436	6.58%	1,443	6.62%	1,457	6.68%	1,502	6.89%	1,549	7.1%	1,592	7.3%	1,777	8.15%	2,112	9.68%	2,182	10.0%
Paul F. Toner	1,703	7.81%	1,756	8.05%	1,756	8.05%	1,759	8.06%	1,771	8.12%	1,776	8.14%	1,792	8.22%	1,801	8.26%	1,813	8.31%	1,952	8.95%	2,012	9.22%	2,096	9.61%	2,182	10.0%
Jivan Sobrinho-Wheeler	1,225	5.62%	1,363	6.25%	1,365	6.26%	1,372	6.29%	1,373	6.29%	1,377	6.31%	1,380	6.33%	1,429	6.55%	1,475	6.76%	1,534	7.03%	1,721	7.89%	1,898	8.7%	Eliminated	
Nicola A. Williams	1,159	5.31%	1,244	5.7%	1,244	5.7%	1,245	5.71%	1,249	5.73%	1,258	5.77%	1,299	5.96%	1,394	6.39%	1,462	6.7%	1,497	6.86%	1,690	7.75%	Eliminated			
Theodora Theo Skeadas	813	3.73%	911	4.18%	915	4.19%	915	4.19%	917	4.2%	921	4.22%	928	4.25%	977	4.48%	1,046	4.8%	1,104	5.06%	Eliminated					
Joe McGuirk	611	2.8%	641	2.94%	641	2.94%	645	2.96%	659	3.02%	665	3.05%	682	3.13%	696	3.19%	727	3.33%	Eliminated							
Dana Bullister	520	2.38%	545	2.5%	548	2.51%	558	2.56%	561	2.57%	574	2.63%	582	2.67%	599	2.75%	Eliminated									
Tonia D. Hicks	363	1.66%	409	1.88%	410	1.88%	419	1.92%	420	1.93%	425	1.95%	449	2.06%	Eliminated											
Frantz Pierre	355	1.63%	382	1.75%	382	1.75%	382	1.75%	384	1.76%	384	1.76%	Eliminated													
Ilan Levy	97	0.44%	99	0.45%	99	0.45%	101	0.46%	103	0.47%	Eliminated															
Gregg J. Moree	80	0.37%	83	0.38%	83	0.38%	84	0.39%	Eliminated																	
Robert Eckstut	70	0.32%	74	0.34%	74	0.34%	Eliminated																			
Write-in	32	0.15%	32	0.15%	Eliminated																					

=== Relationship with Voting Rights Act (VRA) ===
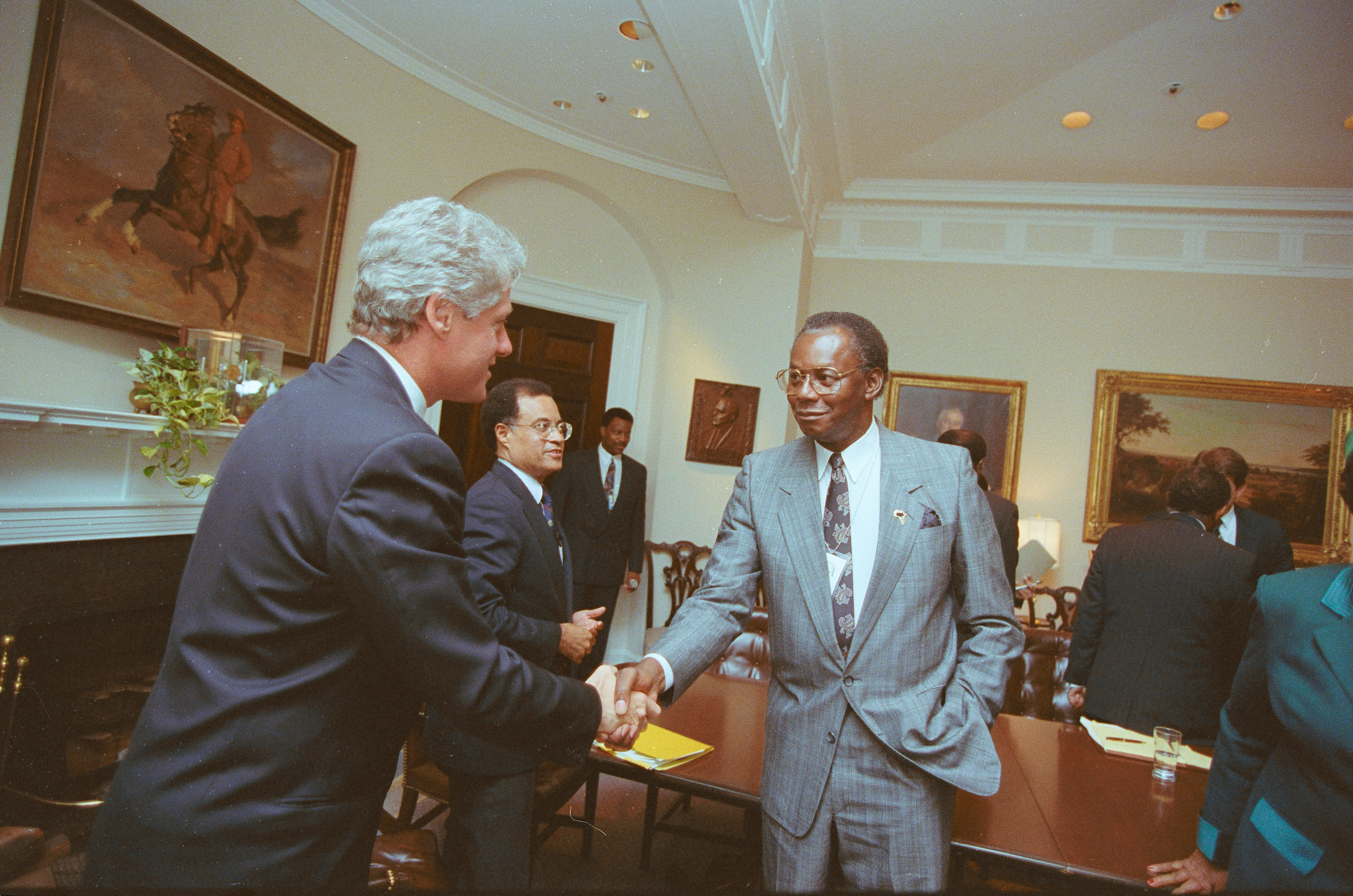
President Bill Clinton meeting with the Civil Rights Coalition regarding the Lani Guinier nomination for Assistant Attorney General.

In 1993, Lani Guinier, a prominent civil rights lawyer, was nominated by then-President Bill Clinton for the Civil Rights Division of the Department of Justice. Guinier's civil rights legal papers on the Voting Rights Act garnered public controversy and Clinton withdrew her nomination, saying "[Guinier] seems to be arguing for principles of proportional representation and minority veto as general remedies that I think are inappropriate as general remedies, anti-democratic, and very difficult to defend."

Some advocates, such as FairVote and More Equitable Democracy, see proportional representation as a solution to the perceived underrepresentation of Black Americans in Congress. Several municipalities had transitioned from block voting systems to STV in the 2020s as a result of VRA lawsuits.

As part of a 2017 Voting Rights Act (VRA) lawsuit, Eastpointe, Michigan was told by the DOJ it needed to change its electoral system. Pastor Albert Rush of Immanuel United Methodist Church expressed concerns over the original proposal to retain FPTP but remain in compliance with the VRA by drawing single-member districts. The original plan was to create a "Black ward" similar to minority-majority districts used for Congressional races. He characterized racial wards as "a step backward." To settle the lawsuit, Eastpointe changed its electoral system from block voting to single transferable vote with a 33.3% threshold. According to More Equitable Democracy, VRA lawsuits can be lengthy and expensive.

In 2023, the Washington Supreme Court found that limited voting, cumulative voting, and single transferable vote (proportional ranked-choice voting) were potential remedies for violations of the Washington Voting Rights Act in a case regarding Latino representation in Franklin County.

Newburgh, New York adopted proportional ranked-choice voting (STV) to resolve a New York Voting Rights Act violation in February 2026. Newburgh had previously elected all five members of its town board members at-large via block voting. The town is currently the first in New York (since the repeals) to use STV. The new system only elects two representatives at a time, resulting in a higher threshold than Portland's races. The transition is expected to elect Black and brown representatives.

In June 2026, a judge in Huntington Beach, California required the city council to be elected all at once using ranked-choice voting, marking the first time in the US when a judge has specifically ordered the use of single transferable vote to settle a state voting rights act dispute (as opposed to a city opting to use STV over single-winner races after the old system was struck down).

In September 2026, the California Voting Rights Act was amended to include "share-based methods" to remedy voting rights act disputes. The bill defines a share-based method as "one in which more than one candidate is to be elected and different groups of voters may each elect their preferred candidates to the seats to fill based on their relative share of the votes cast". The definition is compatible with proportional or semi-proportional elections. The bill requires that any multi-member elections have at least three seats per district. The amendment allows for multi-member districts to be used in voting rights act disputes rather than defaulting to majority-minority districts.

==== Voting Rights Act Supreme Court decisions ====
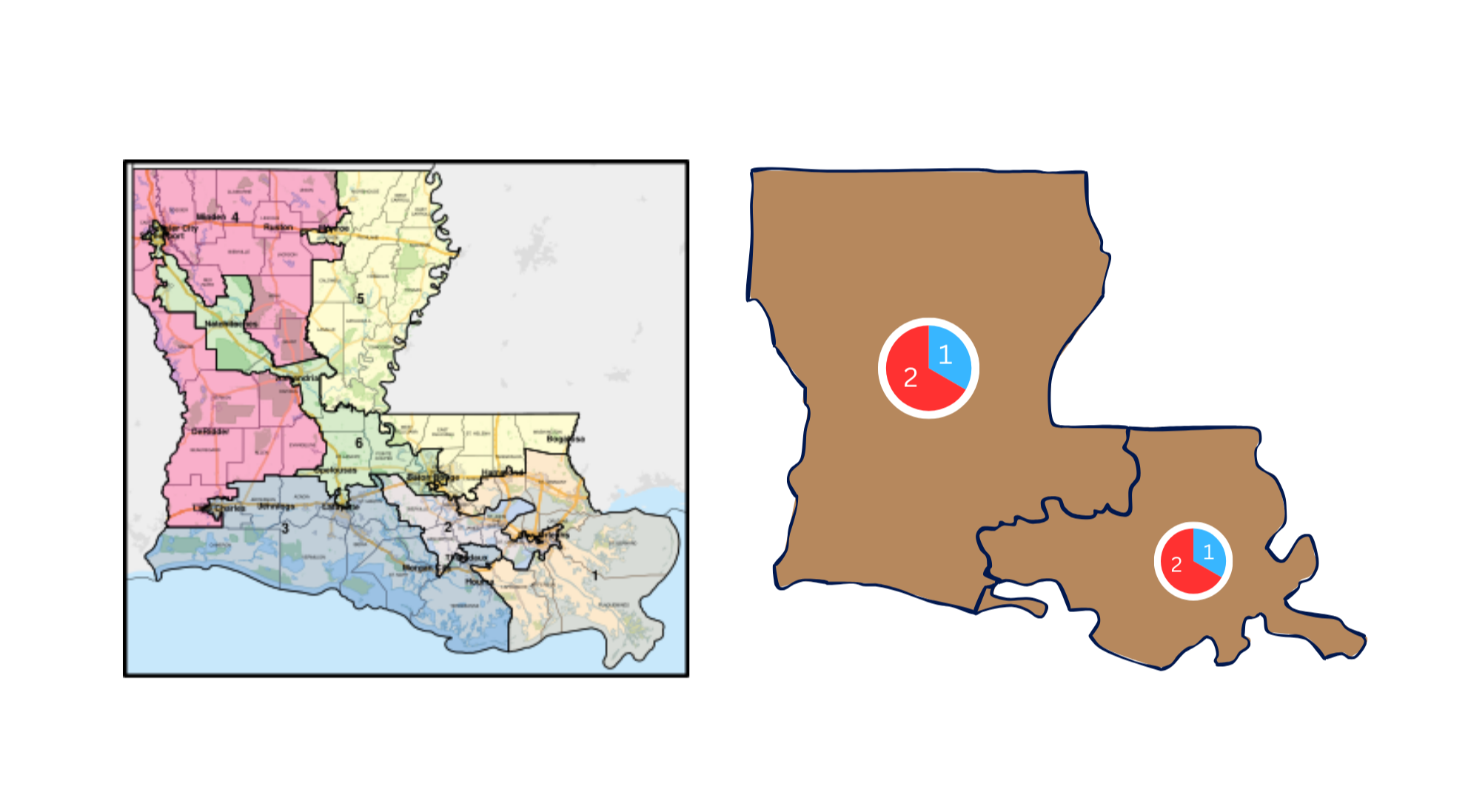
On the right is a sample map of Louisiana under the Fair Representation Act showing more compact multi-member districts than the 2025 Louisiana's congressional district FPTP map that the Supreme Court struck down. It has the ability to elect two Black representatives in the state.

In Thornburg v. Gingles (1986), the Supreme Court created the Gingles test to determine whether a map is illegal under the Voting Rights Act. Its first prong, regarding the compactness and possible creation of majority-minority district, was expanded upon in Johnson v. De Grandy (1994), which found that a jurisdiction is unlikely to be liable for vote dilution if its redistricting plan contains a number of majority-minority districts that is proportional to the minority group's population. This has been understood to have created a form of racial proportional representation as a remedy for VRA violations.

In the Louisiana v. Callais (2026) decision, which made VRA districting lawsuits more difficult to pursue, Justice Clarence Thomas wrote that the court "should never have interpreted §2 of the Voting Rights Act of 1965 to effectively give racial groups 'an entitlement to roughly proportional representation.'" FairVote criticized the court's decision and called for "proportional, multi-member districts that give every community a seat at the table." Former Vice President Kamala Harris called for a "no bad ideas brainstorm" that would include "a conversation about multi-member districts" following 2025-2026 redistricting efforts and the Callais decision.

=== Democratic Socialists of America ===
The Scottish single transferable vote is used to elect chapter delegates that in turn elect the National Political Committee (NPC) of the DSA. The DSA has fielded and elected multiple members to Congress, some endorsed by the NPC.

== Contemporary support and opposition ==
=== Polling ===
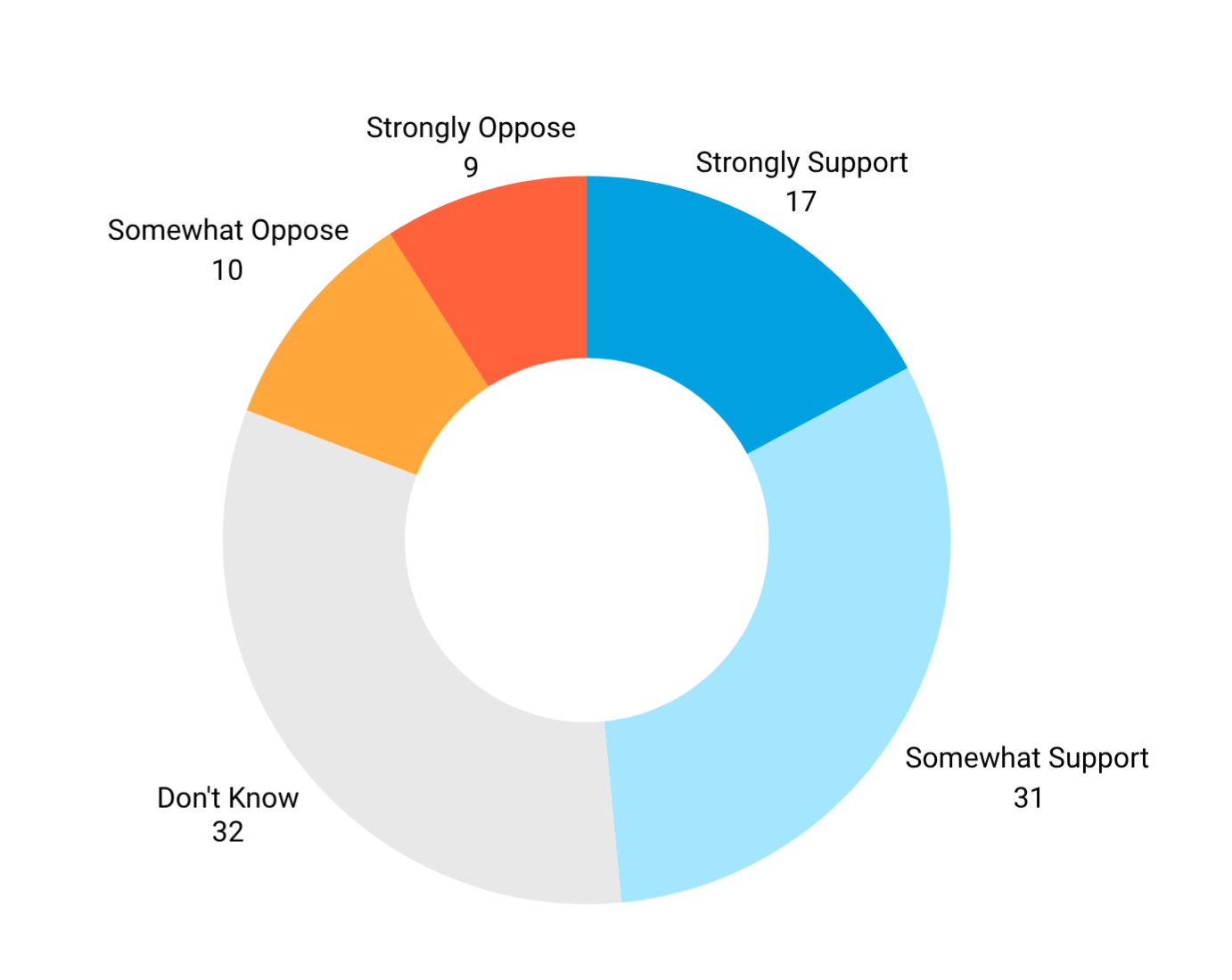
Support for PR in the US House in October 2025, according to Verasight

According to the 2022 Cooperative Election Study conducted by YouGov, 71% of Americans who have a positive opinion on ranked-choice voting also support proportional representation. This may suggest cross-support among the two electoral reforms, especially compared to national popular vote (NPV) support, which had lower support for PR among NPV supporters (58%).

A Citizen Data poll commissioned by Protect Democracy in 2023 found that 59% of Americans had never heard of proportional representation. The poll found that after a generic explanation of PR, support for using proportional representation to elect representatives increased from 24% to 52%. A "Thanksgiving dinner" metaphor (where dishes won spots on the dinner table) resulted in an increase in support for PR to elect representatives from 27.4% to 61.5%.

According to a September 2024 poll commissioned by the American Academy of Arts and Sciences of 3,200 eligible voters, 63% of Americans supported a reform to increase the number of political parties, including a majority of Democrats, independents, and Republicans. A Centiment study funded by FairVote found 66% of Democratic Illinois voters supported using proportional ranked-choice voting in the 2028 Democratic presidential primaries.

In an October 2025 Strength in Numbers poll conducted by Verasight, 48% of Americans said they supported electing the House by proportional representation, 19% were opposed, and 32% said they did not know.

A June-July 2026 Verasight survey commissioned by Fix Our House and New America found that 47% of American support PR for Congress (50% when a definition was provided). 76% of respondents said it concerned them that "48% of the statewide vote could end up with 65% of the seats" under the current system. The poll also found support for traits of proportional systems. Over 50% supported "multiple parties negotiate to form a governing majority", which polled higher than "the winning party governs on its own". 61.1% of respondents supported having multiple local representatives (multi-member districts) where one may share their views, whereas 22.7% of respondents supported having one representative who may or may not share their views. The poll also found support for adding 150 members to the House of Representatives (54.3%) and 79.48% of Americans found party labels helpful when voting. The poll found only 2% of Americans could name PR unprompted, despite support for traits of PR systems.

=== Support ===
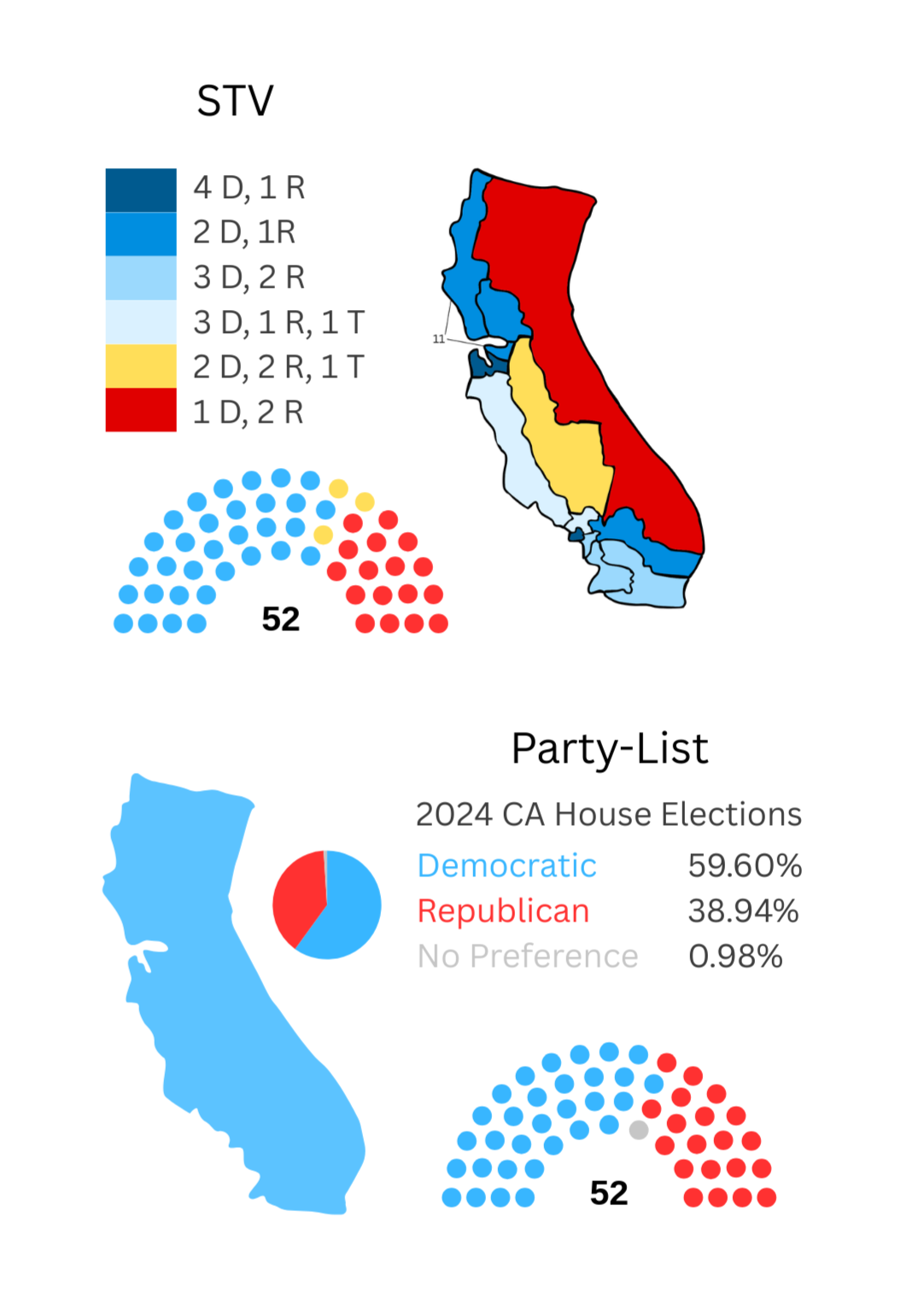
On top is an estimate by Fairvote of party results in US House races in California under the Fair Representation Act. Below is an example of a party-list system that more directly elects candidates in proportion to their vote share. How many seats would go to new parties is a matter of debate among American political scientists.

Journalists Ezra Klein and Matthew Yglesias expressed support for PR in 2026 in response to mid-cycle redistricting. New York Times columnist Jamelle Bouie also supported PR in the House of Representatives following the Callais decision in 2026.

In 2026, Former Secretary of the United States Department of Transportation and presidential candidate Pete Buttigieg endorsed using proportional multi-member districts to elect members for Congress in order to address "systemic issues" preventing the passage of bills that cover "kitchen-table issues." He suggested Democrats should pass a PR bill in 2029.

Former Wisconsin Democratic Chair Ben Wikler supports "doubling [the size of the House], and adopting multi-member districts with proportional representation", which he outlined in his 2026 book, This is the Plan. Wikler argued Democrats should pass PR legislation should they win a trifecta in 2028.

==== Advocacy groups ====
Reform groups such as FairVote, Protect Democracy, and Fix Our House advocate for proportional representation for federal races. More Equitable Democracy advocates for electoral reform as a way of achieving racial equity.

The Democratic Socialists of America released a press statement in May 2026 supporting proportional representation following the Louisiana v. Callais decision. Chapters in San Diego and Portland had expressed support for PR in 2024 prior to the national statement. The official DSA national platform calls for expanding the House and implementing PR.

The ProRep Coalition advocates for use of proportional representation in the California state legislature via ballot initiative, citing increasing poverty, perceived lack of representation for left-of-center ideas in the Democratic Party, and lack of Republican influence on state legislation. The coalition consists of third parties such as the Green Party, Libertarian Party, Forward California, and the American Solidarity Party, as well as advocacy groups such as Represent Women, Californians for Electoral Reform, and Cal RCV.

Over 200 American professors and scholars wrote an open letter to Congress in support of proportional representation in 2022, and 500 scholars wrote a follow-up supportive letter in 2026. The group calls itself "Scholars for Electoral Reform." Among its signers are Steven Levitsky, Nicholas Stephanopoulos, and Larry Sabato.

==== State legislature sponsors ====
In 2026, Wyoming state senators Troy McKeown and Laursen Cooper introduced legislation to elect the Wyoming Legislature by closed-list proportional representation with list order determined by party primaries.

==== Congressional sponsors ====
In October 1995, during the 104th Congress, Representative Cynthia McKinney introduced the Voters' Choice Act, which would have overturned the ban on multi-member districts for Congressional races and allowed for the use of cumulative and limited voting (semi-proportional systems) or single transferable vote (then described as preferential multi-member). Unlike later proposed legislation, adoption of STV would be left to the states.

Every Congressional session since the 115th United States Congress, Congressman Don Beyer has introduced the Fair Representation Act, which would split states into multi-member districts that would elect 3-5 representatives using STV, similar to the Dáil Éireann (lower house in Ireland). Jamie Raskin, a cosponsor of the bill, said multi-member ranked-choice races should also include independent nonpartisan commissions to draw borders for new districts. Raskin said Congressional support and interest in PR have increased significantly since the Louisiana v. Callais decision.

Representative Sean Casten's Equal Voices Act would expand the size of the House of Representatives and allow for the optional use of multi-member districts. Casten also introduced a constitutional amendment in the 118th Congress to expand the Senate by 12 members to be elected nationwide using proportional ranked-choice voting.

Representatives Marie Gluesenkamp Perez and Jared Golden supported the creation of an Electoral Reform Select Committee in the 119th Congress that would examine the current electoral system for Congressmembers and analyze alternatives, such as PR and expanding the House.

=== Opposition ===
In January 2026, House Republicans introduced the Make Elections Great Again Act, which would prohibit ranked-choice voting for federal elections (prohibiting STV) and prohibit any federal system that "permits a voter to vote for more than one candidate for the same office." No modern sitting federal Republican politician has endorsed federal legislation to enact proportional representation.

New York University School of Law professor Richard Pildes argued that political tensions are not inherent to first-past-the-post (FPTP) systems, and he said that the tensions surrounding Brexit were an aberrance in the political climate of the United Kingdom, which uses FPTP. He also questioned how many parties would form without reform to the Senate. Pildes suggested state legislature multi-member district (MMD) reform efforts to be a better starting place than federal races and recommended nonpartisan reforms to the primary process instead.

==== Incumbent hesitancy ====
According to the American Academy of Arts and Sciences, some lawmakers elected through winner-take-all elections were hesitant to change the system under which they had been elected, and one said that implementation of PR might require a delay period to pass. Dustin Wahl, executive director of Fix Our House, argued that PR would be "dead in the water" without expanding the House of Representatives, since Congressmembers would not want to vote themselves out of office.

== Effects ==
=== Historical ===
PR prevented vote splitting and undermined the effects of political machines in cities that used it in the 1920s.

In New York City, under STV, 80% of legislation was passed unanimously. In the 1939 election, Genevieve Earle formed a multiracial women's committee to attempt to elect a Black candidate that she had beaten the previous election. Commentators said this showed no resentment between the two.

In the NYC 1939 city council election, which used PR, voter turnout was 90%.

Turnover of representatives between two PR elections in New York City (1937 and 1939) was low, and only four out of 21 councilmembers following the 1939 election were newcomers.

==== Race ====
According to Hoag, PR undermined the Ku Klux Klan's ability to enter and control government in Ashtabula and Cleveland in the 1920s, since they did not have majority support. In Cincinnati, Black residents consistently elected 2 (out of 9) Black councilmembers under PR, a disproportionate result for the city's demographics. After the repeal in 1957, the city did not have two Black councilmembers concurrently until 1992. The first Black candidate to win an office in Toledo, Ohio was elected via single transferable vote in 1945.

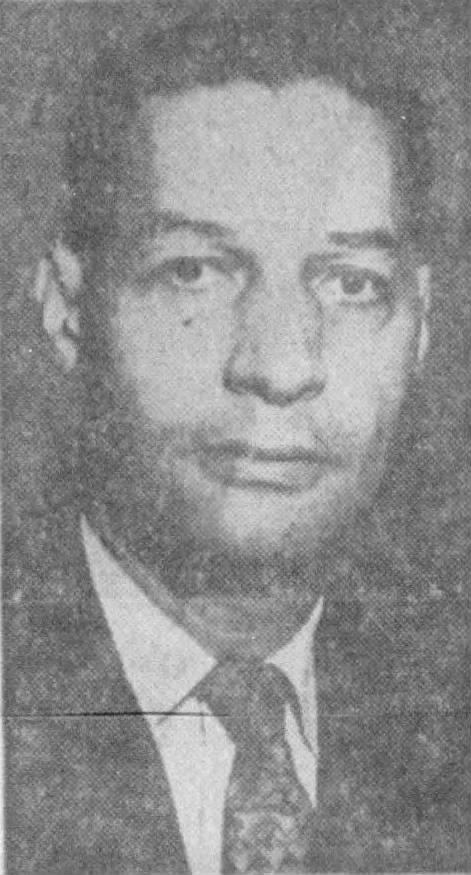
Ted Berry, Cincinnati's first Black Mayor elected under PR in 1949

Before the Louisiana v. Callais decision, Voting Rights Act lawsuits resulted in a transition away from block voting to STV in some municipalities.

Portland, which had been typically run by white men under FPTP, elected a majority POC city council in 2024 under STV.

==== Women's representation ====
In Portland's 2024 election, women won 50% of the seats. Previously, only 10 women had ever been elected to the city council.

==== Number of parties ====
In Ohio, of the five cities that adopted PR, only one had a minor party enter city council (one seat in Ashtabula). Cities in Ohio had a de facto two-party system (as opposed to one-party rule that had preceded the change) and not a multi-party system. In New York City, multiple parties arose due to large, diverse interests competing for seats.

=== Proposed ===
==== Federal ====
During the 2026 midterms, 270toWin projected only 77 out of 435 seats were not "safe" for either party in the House (17.7% of the total). PR advocates say it could increase the number of competitive seats.

PR may expand national focus from swing races to unrepresented groups, such as Republicans in Democratic congressional districts.

PR elections could introduce three or more political parties to Congress, requiring collaborative coalitions to elect a Speaker of the House. Proportional representation could allow for centrist or syncretic parties to form coalitions in the House.

===== Race and the Voting Rights Act =====
Proponents of federal proportional representation argue it could give more electoral sway to minority groups who do not currently live in majority-minority districts. The threshold to be elected to Congress would be lower under a proportional voting system. In response to Miller v. Johnson (1995), Representative Cynthia McKinney saw PR as a solution to underrepresentation of African Americans in Congress.

== Gallery ==
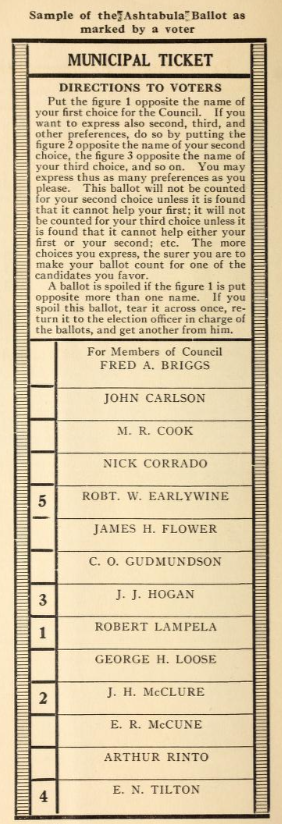
Sample ballot for the first election using proportional representation in the United States in 1915

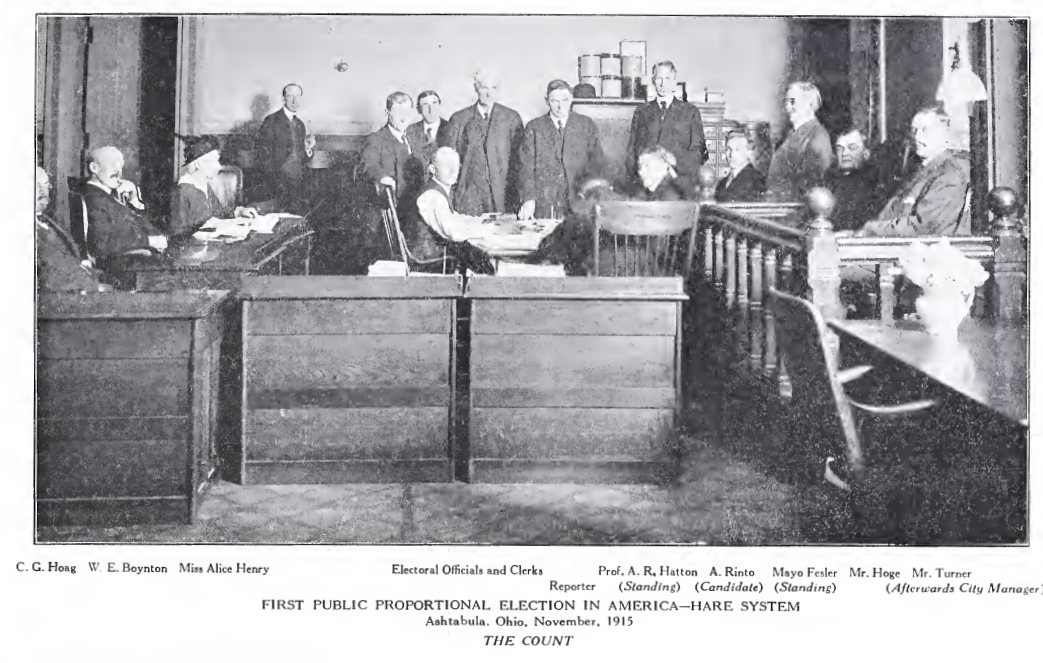
Election officials count ballots for the first PR election for public office in America in Ashtabula, Ohio

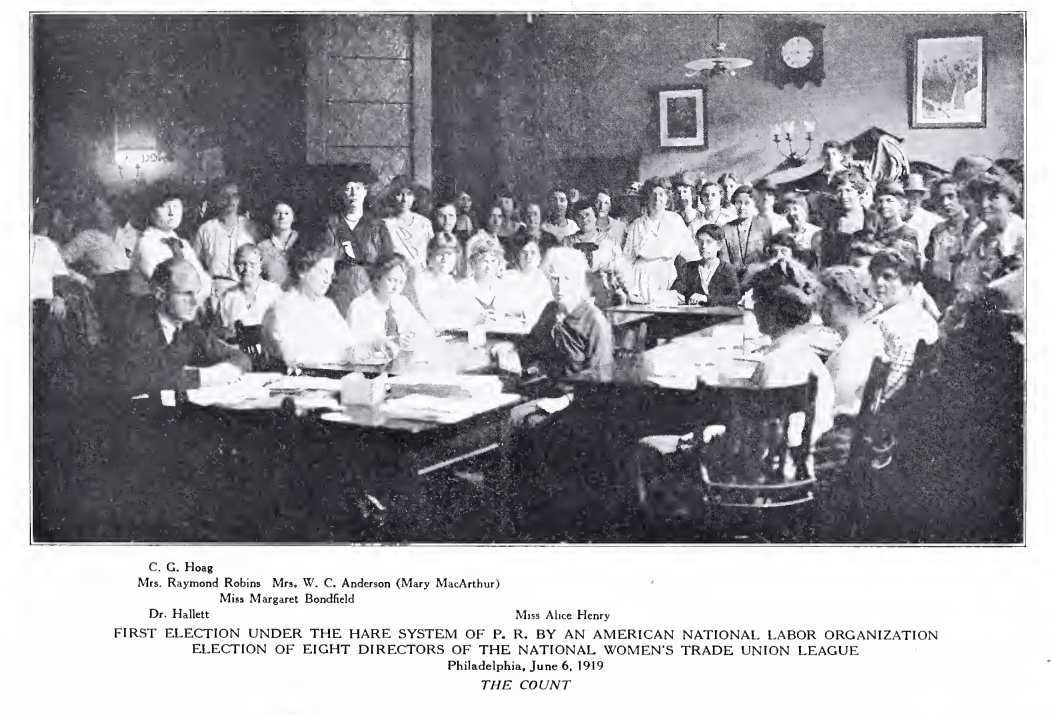
The first American election using STV for a labor organization (Women's Trade Union League) in June 1919

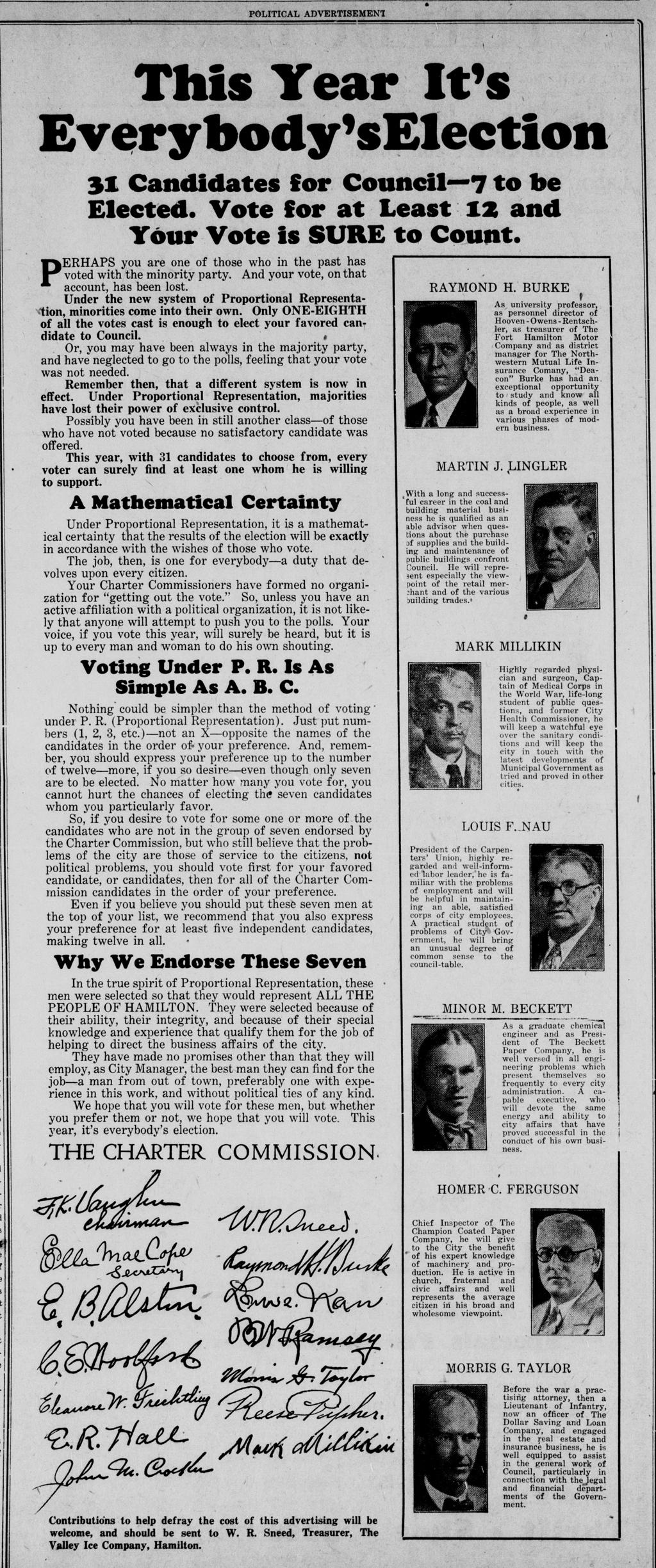
Charter Commission political ad explaining how to vote for endorsed candidates in the 1927 Hamilton, Ohio City Council election

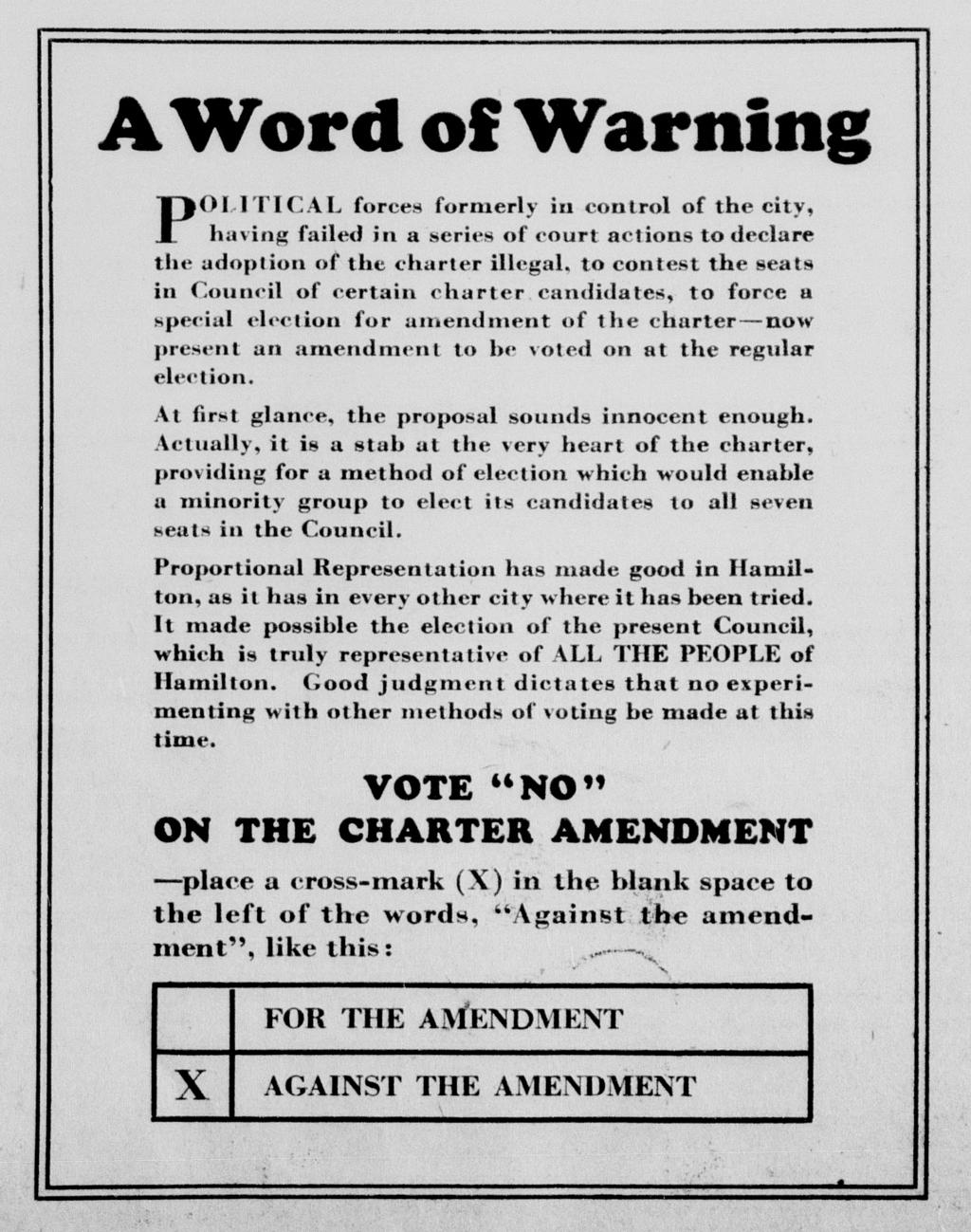
The Charter Commission of Hamilton, Ohio advocate against a repeal of PR in 1929 and for the city council to continue to be run in "non-political form."

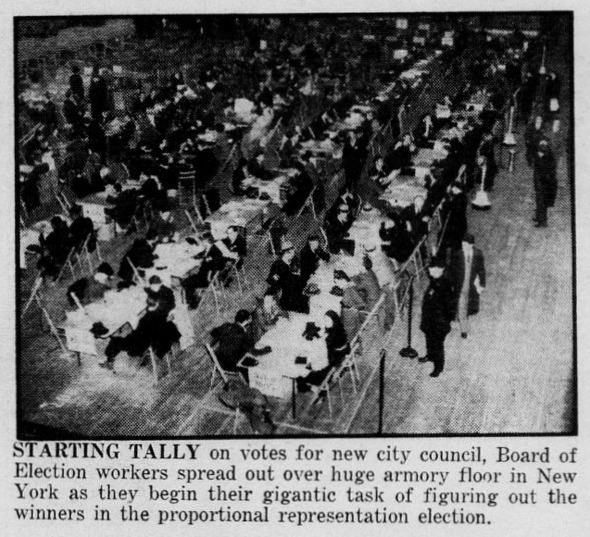
Election workers count STV ballots for the 1937 New York City Council election

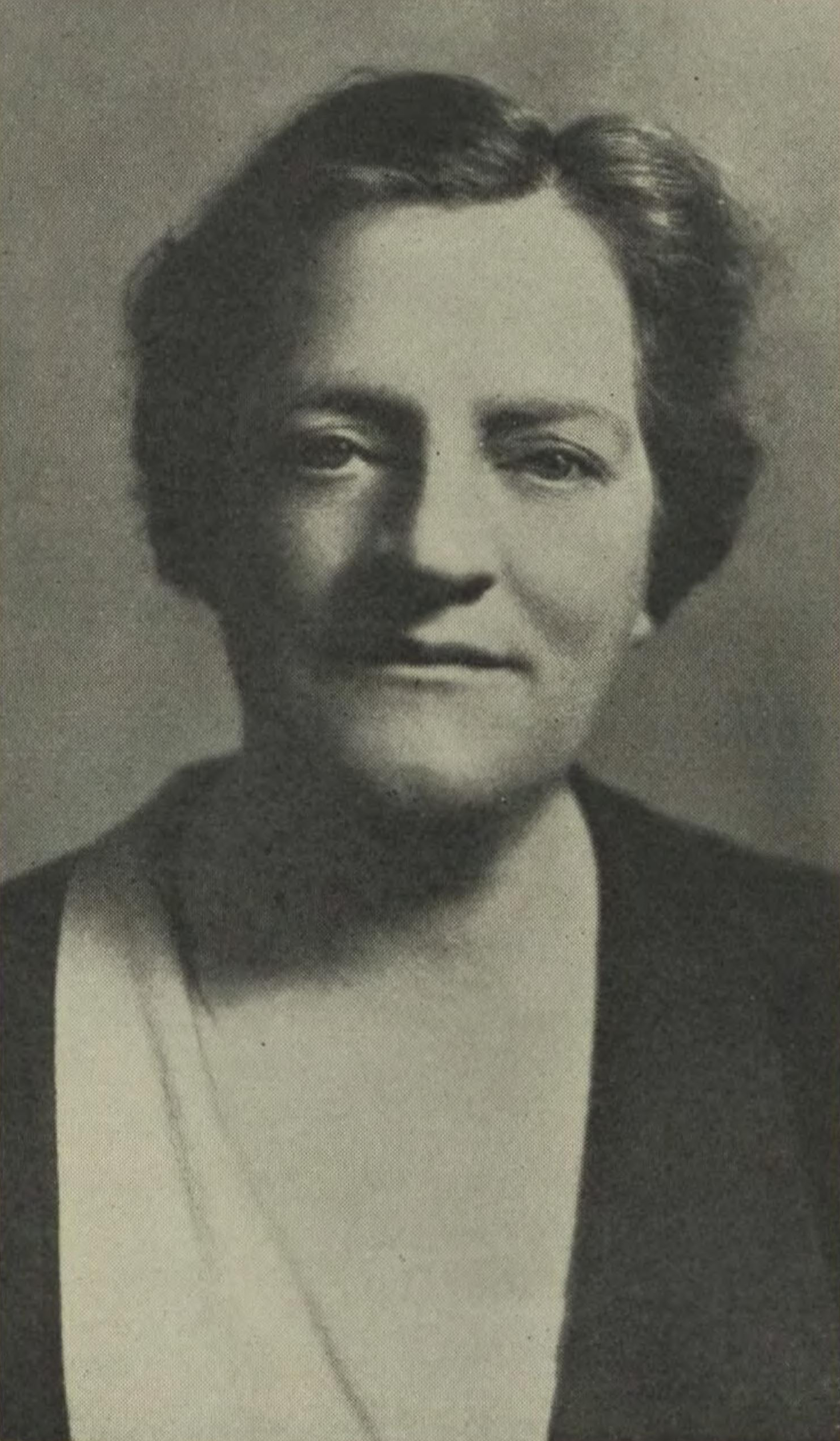
The first woman NYC councilmember, Genevieve Earle, was elected in 1939.

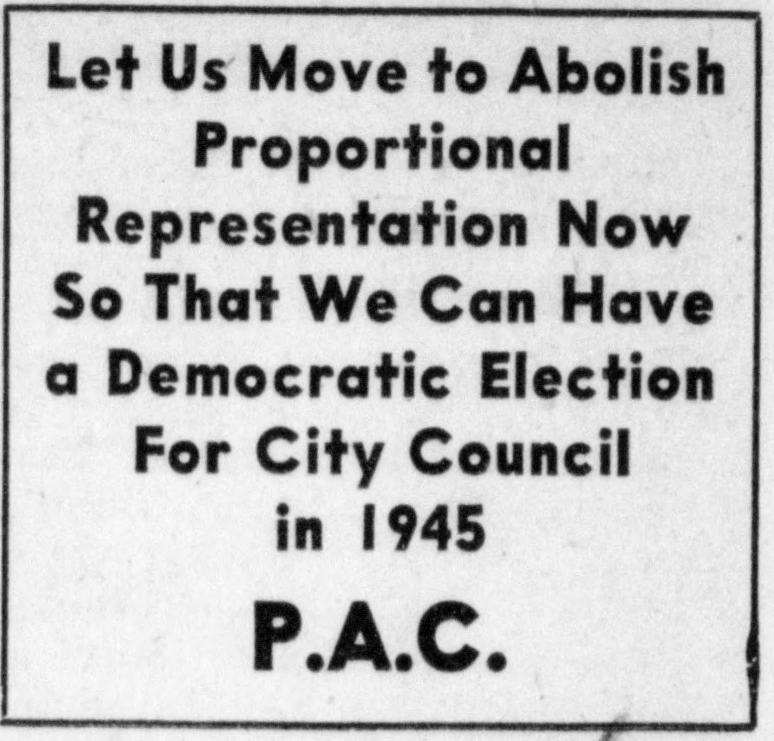
Anti-PR political advertisement in the Toledo Union Journal

== See also ==
- 1993 New Zealand electoral reform referendum
- Above-the-line voting
- Duverger's law – Plurality voting in single-member districts tends to favor two-party competition
- Electoral reform in Illinois—Illinois used cumulative voting, a semi-proportional system, to elect its legislature between 1870 and 1980
- Electoral reform in the United States
- Reform of the Senate
- Proportional representation in Canada
- Proportional representation in the United Kingdom

=== Images ===
- TimesMachine: October 21, 1936 - NYTimes.com—La Guardia meeting with PR advocates
- TimesMachine: November 1, 1937 - NYTimes.com—Sample ballot for 1937 NYC city council election (pages 4 and 5)
