= Fair Representation Act =

Fair Representation Act may refer to:

- Fair Representation Act (Canada)
- Fair Representation Act (United States)
