= 2004 Colorado Amendment 36 =

Amendment 36
- November 2, 2004
- Selection of Presidential Electors

Results
Choice	Votes	%
Yes	696,770	34.78%
No	1,306,834	65.22%
Valid votes	2,003,604	93.38%
Invalid or blank votes	141,951	6.62%
Total votes	2,145,555	100.00%
Registered voters/turnout	2,421,970	88.59%
County results
For
50–60%
Against
80-90%
70–80%
60–70%
50–60%

Amendment 36 was an initiated constitutional amendment on the ballot in Colorado on November 2, 2004. It would have changed the way in which the state apportioned its electoral votes. Rather than assigning all of the state's electors to the candidate with a plurality of popular votes, under the amendment, Colorado would have assigned presidential electors proportionally to the statewide vote count, which would be a unique system (Nebraska and Maine assign electoral votes based on vote totals within each congressional district). The amendment did not pass.

== Contents ==
The amendment appeared on the ballot as follows:

Shall there be an amendment to the Colorado constitution concerning popular proportional selection of presidential electors, and, in connection therewith, creating procedures for allocating Colorado's electoral votes for president and vice-president of the United States, based on the proportion of ballots that are cast in this state for each presidential ticket; making the terms of the proposed amendment effective so that popular proportional selection of presidential electors applies to the 2004 general election; setting forth procedures and timelines that govern the certification of election results and the potential recounting of votes in elections for presidential electors and in the election on this proposed amendment; granting the Colorado supreme court original jurisdiction for the adjudication of all contests concerning presidential electors and requiring that such matters be heard and decided on an expedited basis; and authorizing the general assembly to enact legislation to change the manner of selecting presidential electors or any of the procedures contained in this amendment?

== Results ==
The amendment ultimately failed, garnering only 34.78% of the vote:

Colorado Amendment 36
Choice	Votes	%
Yes (proportional split)	696,770	34.78
No (remains winner-take-all)	1,306,834	65.22
Total	2,003,604	100.00
Registered voters/turnout	2,421,970	88.59%
