= Uniform Congressional District Act =

American electoral law (enacted 1967)

- Long title: An Act for the relief of Doctor Ricardo Vallejo Samala and to provide for congressional redistricting. (Note: Sen. Howard Baker of Tennessee tacked on a non-germane amendment—a federal ban on elections at large in all states with more than one Representative—to a previously insignificant private bill.)
- Enacted by: the 90th United States Congress
- Effective: December 14, 1967

Citations
- Public law: Pub. L. 90–196
- Statutes at Large: 81 Stat. 581

Codification
- Titles amended: Title 2—The Congress
- U.S.C. sections created: 2 U.S.C. § 2c

Legislative history
- Introduced in the House as H.R. 2275 by Bob Sikes (D–FL) on January 12, 1967; Committee consideration by House Judiciary; Passed the House on October 17, 1967; Passed the Senate on November 8, 1967 with amendment; House agreed to Senate amendment on November 28, 1967 (202–179) with further amendment; Senate agreed to House amendment on November 30, 1967 (54–24); Signed into law by President Lyndon B. Johnson on December 14, 1967

The Uniform Congressional District Act is a redistricting bill that requires all members of the United States House of Representatives in the 91st United States Congress and every Congress afterwards to be elected from a single-member district unless a state had elected all of its previous representatives at large, for which this requirement commenced for the 92nd United States Congress.

== Historical context ==
=== Since 1929 ===
The Supreme Court of the United States ruled in Wood v. Broom, 287 U.S. 1 (1932) that previous requirements contained within the Apportionment Act of 1911 in relation to congressional districting and the manner of how representatives were to be elected were no longer in force, due to the enactment of the Reapportionment Act of 1929. The result of this is that there were no requirements imposed upon the states by Congress as to how representatives were to be elected to the House of Representatives. The Reapportionment Act of 1929 did not contain any requirements on how representatives were to be elected, including any requirements on how districts were to be drawn (if the state legislature chose to use districts), due to the presumption by Congress that the requirements enacted by the Apportionment Act of 1911 were still in force since Congress never repealed those requirements.

As newly allowed by Wood, Missouri (13 seats), Kentucky (9), Virginia (9), Minnesota (9), (Note: Minnesota had not originally intended to elect its representatives at large, but was forced to do so after the Supreme Court's decision in Smiley v. Holm invalidated the state's congressional map as not having been validly passed, as the state legislature would not return to session until January 1933 and it was therefore impossible to pass a new map into law in time for the 1932 elections.) and North Dakota (2), elected all their representatives at large; Texas elected 3 of their 21 seats at large; New York, Illinois, and Ohio each elected 2 of their seats at large; and Oklahoma, Connecticut, and Florida each elected 1 of their seats at large in the 1932 United States House of Representatives elections. All the states that elected some of their representatives at large (except Illinois) had gained seats from reapportionment but continued to use their previous congressional district boundaries while electing their new representatives at large. Arizona would continue to elect their representatives at large until 1946, even after gaining a second seat in 1943, and New Mexico and Hawaii would continue to elect all their representatives at large from their admission into the union until 1968 and 1970 respectively. Alabama also elected all eight of its representatives at large in 1962. Meanwhile, those states that elected representatives from single-member districts often elected representatives from districts that were not compact, contiguous, or roughly equal in population.

=== Colegrove era ===
In 1946, the Supreme Court of the United States ruled in a 4-3 decision Colegrove v. Green that the federal courts do not have jurisdiction to interfere with malapportioned congressional districts, with Congress having the sole authority to interfere with the same. For the following fifteen years, both congressional districts and state legislative districts often had large population imbalances. The imbalance in the population of different congressional districts could have been fixed by an act of Congress but Congress failed to enact any standards and requirements concerning congressional districts and elections. Due to congressional inaction and new justices on the Supreme Court, the courts intervened in 1962 in the case Baker v. Carr which required that all state legislative districts be of roughly equal population. The court used the Fourteenth Amendment to the United States Constitution to justify its ruling (specifically the Equal Protection Clause). Wesberry v. Sanders extended Baker to the districts of the United States House of Representatives.

== Legislative history ==
The act was enacted by Congress in 1967 primarily due to two reasons: the fear that the courts would force elections to be conducted at large if congressional districts were not compliant with federal jurisprudence or law, and the concern that southern states might dissolve their districts so that racial minorities would not be able to elect representatives from a minority race after the enactment of the Voting Rights Act of 1965.

In general, the requirement that all members of the House of Representatives be elected from single-member districts was widely supported by Congress, with Representative Gerald Ford stating, "I happen to feel that at-large elections are completely the wrong way for the election of Members of this body." The only real contention to this bill was whether there should be an exemption for Hawaii and New Mexico since they had always elected their representatives at large, with Senator Daniel Inouye of Hawaii stating "because of geographical reasons, it is not very simple to district the State of Hawaii. With the adoption of the amendment, an orderly transition will be possible for our State." Senator Clinton Anderson of New Mexico argued that his state "has not been redistricted and it would cause a lot of trouble at this late hour to redistrict." However, there were members of Congress opposed to this exemption, with Senator Roman Hruska of Nebraska arguing that "The proposal before us will apply to every State in the Union except two. That is not good legislation. It certainly is not good principle," while Senator Gordon Allott of Colorado was opposed due to selfish reasons, arguing that "If under a decree of court one State could be required to be redistricted, there is no excuse for one State, two States, or 20 States to be excepted from that which others had to do."

Due to the widespread support of the members of Congress that there was a pressing need to ban elections at large, both the House and the Senate passed the bill with a voice vote, although the bill did allow for Hawaii and New Mexico to elect their representatives from state-wide districts two years later than all other states due to their need to draw congressional districts for the first time in their histories.

== Impact ==
Due to the Uniform Congressional District Act, elections to the House of Representatives are very similar to elections to the House of Commons of Canada and the House of Commons of the United Kingdom, except constituencies in the United States tend to have greater populations. These and other countries' electoral bodies use first-past-the-post (FPTP) electoral rules to decide the winner of an election. However, one distinction is that in the United States, there are typically only two major parties on the ticket for an election to Congress. As a result, the winning candidate often receives a majority (or close to a majority). By contrast, constituencies in countries that regularly have more than two candidates on the ballot (such as Canada or the United Kingdom) tend to only be won by a plurality, not a majority. FPTP, as a result, may be interpreted to be inherently less representative than other election processes, such as mixed-member proportional representation, which is in use in Germany and New Zealand.

Competitive single-member districts elected by FPTP can be inherently less representative than safe districts: if a candidate only wins by a narrow majority or a plurality, many voters may feel disenfranchised with the result. However, in multi-member proportional districts, the proportion of the vote won by a political party results in them winning a similar proportion of seats in a multi-member district, especially when overhang seats and leveling seats are part of the electoral system. A comparable solution is ranked-choice voting (RCV), in which voters rank candidates by preference, who are eliminated in rounds until a candidate wins a majority.

Some advocacy groups, such as FairVote and Fix Our House have advocated for repealing the single-member-district requirement as a part of adopting proportional representation in the United States.

== See also ==
- Representation of the People Act 1884
- Redistribution of Seats Act 1885
- Representation of the People Act 1948
- Royal Assent by Commission Act 1541, an example of an act that contains two unrelated or distantly related subjects within the same act.
