= Fair Representation Act (United States) =

Bill of the United States Congress

- Long title: To establish the use of ranked choice voting in elections for Representatives in Congress, to require each State with more than one Representative to establish multi-member congressional districts, to require States to conduct congressional redistricting through independent commissions, and for other purposes.
- Number of co-sponsors: 8

Legislative history
- Introduced in the House of Representatives as H.R. 3863 by Don Beyer (D–VA) on June 14, 2021; Committee consideration by House Judiciary

The Fair Representation Act (H.R. 3863) is a bill filed in the United States House of Representatives. Originally introduced in 2017 during the 115th Congress by Don Beyer (D–VA), it was reintroduced by Beyer in 2019, 2021, 2024 and 2025.

The bill has three main provisions:

- Establish independent redistricting commissions in all states to prevent gerrymandering
- Creating multi-member districts for elections to the House of Representatives, with each district having 3 to 5 members
- Require the use of ranked choice voting, in particular single transferable vote, to elect members to the House

The Fair Representation Act has been endorsed by the non-profit activist group FairVote.

== Purpose ==
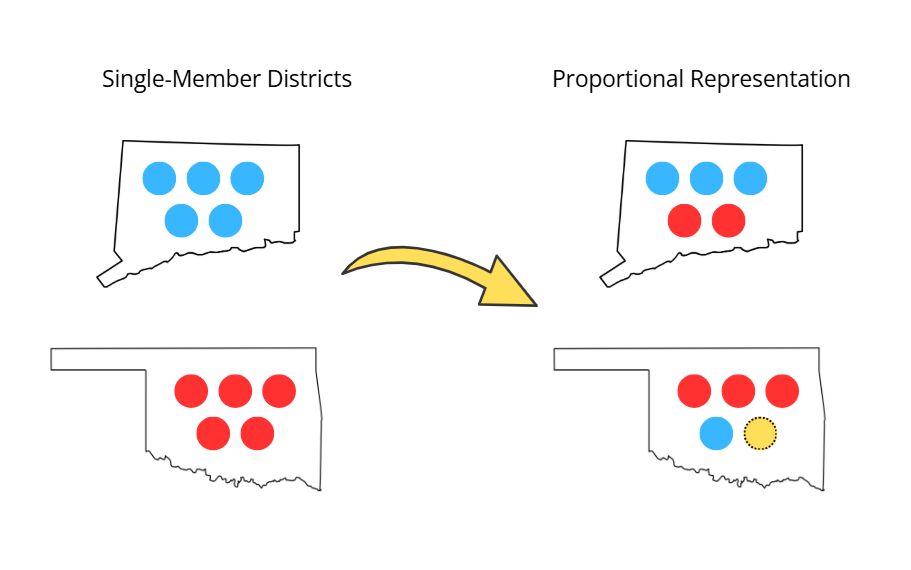
Possible representation in the congressional delegations of Connecticut and Oklahoma under the Fair Representation Act, which is designed to eliminate partisan gerrymandering.

Beyer has stated the goal of the bill is to reduce polarization and partisanship by incentivizing elected representatives to appeal to a broader range of voters. He further argues that ranked choice voting and multi-seat districts would reduce the number of safe-seat districts and encourage more political competition.

The act is also alleged to ensure more proportional representation, both with political parties but also with the election of more women and minority candidates. Additionally, it is argued that the act, if passed, would dramatically curb the potential for gerrymandered districts.

== Legislative history ==
Congress	Short title	Bill number	Date introduced	Number of cosponsors	Latest status
115th	Fair Representation Act of 2017	H.R. 3057	July 14, 2017	5	Referred to the Subcommittee on the Constitution and Civil Justice
116th	Fair Representation Act of 2019	H.R. 4000	July 25, 2019	7	Referred to Subcommittee on the Constitution, Civil Rights, and Civil Liberties
117th	Fair Representation Act of 2021	H.R. 3863	June 11, 2021	8	Referred to the Committee on the Judiciary and the Committee on House Administration
118th	Fair Representation Act of 2024	H.R. 7740	March 20, 2024	7	Referred to the Committee on the Judiciary and the Committee on House Administration
119th	Fair Representation Act	H.R.4632	July 23, 2025	7	Referred to the Committee on the Judiciary and the Committee on House Administration

== See also ==
- Single transferable vote
- Electoral reform in the United States
- Proportional representation in the United States
- Ranked-choice voting in the United States
- For the People Act
