= Fix Our House =

- Founded: March 2022
- Location: United States
- Key people: Lee Drutman, Eli Zupnick, and Dr. Charlotte Hill (co-founders)
- Website: www.fixourhouse.org

Fix Our House is an American nonprofit electoral reform organization that advocates for instituting proportional representation (PR) in the House of Representatives. The organization views PR as a solution to polarization, gerrymandering, safe and uncontested seats, and hyper-partisan primaries. The group has ties to the anti-filibuster Fix Our Senate.

== Goals ==
In an interview with Roll Call, co-founder Eli Zupnick stated, "We are much more focused on making the case for proportional representation, generally, as a first step — for people to understand why this is important, to understand why the current system is broken."

Fix Our House supports amending or repealing Uniform Congressional District Act, a 1967 law that states "no district [is] to elect more than one Representative." The group advocates changing single-member districts in House races to multi-member districts, sometimes by splitting states into several districts with multiple members.
