= Cryogenic fuel =

Fuels which require storage at very low temperatures to remain liquid

Cryogenic fuels are fuels that require storage at extremely low temperatures in order to maintain them in a liquid state. These fuels are used in machinery that operates in space (e.g. rockets and satellites) where ordinary fuel cannot be used, due to the very low temperatures often encountered in space, and the absence of an environment that supports combustion (on Earth, oxygen is abundant in the atmosphere, whereas human-explorable space is a vacuum where oxygen is virtually non-existent). Cryogenic fuels most often constitute liquefied gases such as liquid hydrogen.

Some rocket engines use regenerative cooling, the practice of circulating their cryogenic fuel around the nozzles before the fuel is pumped into the combustion chamber and ignited. This arrangement was first suggested by Eugen Sänger in the 1940s. All engines in the Saturn V rocket that sent the first crewed missions to the Moon used this design element, which is still in use today for liquid-fueled engines.

Quite often, liquid oxygen is mistakenly called cryogenic fuel, though it is actually an oxidizer and not fuel - like in any combustion engine, only the non-oxygen component of the combustion is considered "fuel", although this distinction is arbitrary.

Russian aircraft manufacturer Tupolev developed a version of its popular Tu-154 design but with a cryogenic fuel system, designated the Tu-155. Using a fuel referred to as liquefied natural gas (LNG), its first flight was in 1989.

== Operation ==
Cryogenic fuels can be placed into two categories: inert and flammable or combustible. Both types exploit the large liquid-to-gas volume ratio that occurs when liquid transitions to gas phase. The feasibility of cryogenic fuels is associated with what is known as a high mass flow rate. With regulation, the high-density energy of cryogenic fuels is utilized to produce thrust in rockets and controllable consumption of fuel. The following sections provide further detail.

=== Inert ===
These types of fuels typically use the regulation of gas production and flow to power pistons in an engine. The large increases in pressure are controlled and directed toward the engine's pistons. The pistons move due to the mechanical power transformed from the monitored production of gaseous fuel. A notable example can be seen in Peter Dearman's liquid air vehicle. Some common inert fuels include:

- Liquid nitrogen
- Liquid air
- Liquid helium
- Liquid neon

=== Combustible ===
These fuels utilize the beneficial liquid cryogenic properties along with the flammable nature of the substance as a source of power. These types of fuel are well known primarily for their use in rockets. Some common combustible fuels include:

- Liquid hydrogen
- Liquid natural gas (LNG)
- Liquid methane

== Engine combustion ==
Combustible cryogenic fuels offer much more utility than most inert fuels can. Liquefied natural gas, as with any fuel, will only combust when properly mixed with the right amounts of air. As for LNG, the bulk majority of efficiency depends on the methane number, which is the gas equivalent of the octane number. This is determined based on the methane content of the liquefied fuel and any other dissolved gas, and varies as a result of experimental efficiencies. Maximizing efficiency in combustion engines will be a result of determining the proper fuel to air ratio and utilizing the addition other hydrocarbons for added optimal combustion.

== Production efficiency ==
Gas liquefying processes have been improving over the past decades with the advent of better machinery and control of system heat losses. Typical techniques take advantage of the temperature of the gas dramatically cooling as the controlled pressure of a gas is released. Enough pressurization and then subsequent depressurization can liquefy most gases, as exemplified by the Joule-Thomson effect.

=== Liquefied natural gas ===
While it is cost-effective to liquefy natural gas for storage, transport, and use, roughly 10 to 15 percent of the gas gets consumed during the process. The optimal process contains four stages of propane refrigeration and two stages of ethylene refrigeration. There can be the addition of an additional refrigerant stage, but the additional costs of equipment are not economically justifiable. Efficiency can be tied to the pure component cascade processes which minimize the overall source to sink temperature difference associated with refrigerant condensing. The optimized process incorporates optimized heat recovery along with the use of pure refrigerants. All process designers of liquefaction plants using proven technologies face the same challenge: to efficiently cool and condense a mixture with a pure refrigerant. In the optimized Cascade process, the mixture to be cooled and condensed is the feed gas. In the propane mixed refrigerant processes, the two mixtures requiring cooling and condensing are the feed gas and the mixed refrigerant. The chief source of inefficiency lies in the heat exchange train during the liquefaction process.

== Advantages and disadvantages ==
=== Benefits ===
- Cryogenic fuels are environmentally cleaner than gasoline or fossil fuels. Among other things, the greenhouse gas rate could potentially be reduced by 11–20% using LNG as opposed to gasoline when transporting goods.
- Along with their eco-friendly nature, they have the potential to significantly decrease transportation costs of inland products because of their abundance compared to that of fossil fuels.
- Cryogenic fuels have a higher mass flow rate than fossil fuels and therefore produce more thrust and power when combusted for use in an engine. This means that engines will run farther on less fuel overall than modern gas engines.
- Cryogenic fuels are non-pollutants and therefore, if spilled, are no risk to the environment. There will be no need to clean up hazardous waste after a spill.

=== Potential drawbacks ===
- Some cryogenic fuels, like LNG, are naturally combustible. Ignition of fuel spills could result in a large explosion. This is possible in the case of a car crash with an LNG engine.
- Cryogenic storage tanks must be able to withstand high pressure. High-pressure propellant tanks require thicker walls and stronger alloys which make the vehicle tanks heavier, thereby reducing performance.
- Despite non-toxic tendencies, cryogenic fuels are denser than air. As such, they can lead to asphyxiation. If leaked, the liquid will boil into a very dense, cold gas and if inhaled, could be fatal.

== See also ==
- Cryogenic rocket engine
- Liquid rocket propellant
- Tupolev Tu-244
