= Space vehicle =

Combination of launch vehicle and spacecraft

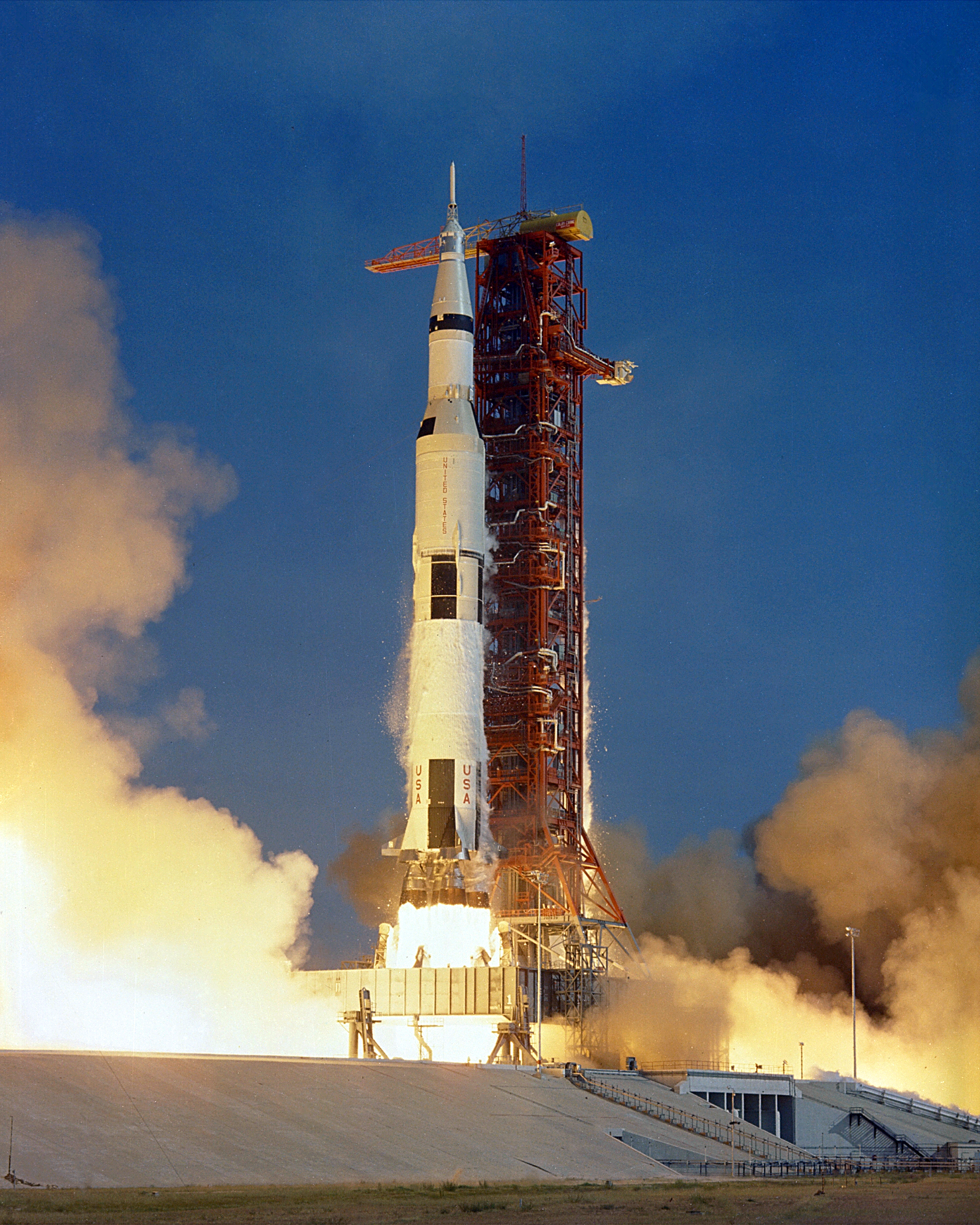
Apollo/Saturn V, the largest and heaviest space vehicle brought into operational status as of May 2022.

A space vehicle is the combination of a spacecraft and its launch vehicle which carries it into space. The earliest space vehicles were expendable launch systems, using a single or multistage rocket to carry a relatively small spacecraft in proportion to the total vehicle size and mass. An early exception to this, the Space Shuttle, consisted of a reusable orbital vehicle carrying crew and payload, supported by an expendable external propellant tank and two reusable solid-fuel booster rockets.

Reusable launch systems are currently being developed by private industry.

Early spacecraft or space vehicles were sometimes known as "spaceships", a term which comes from science fiction to designate a hypothetical vehicle which travels beyond low Earth orbit and is 100% reusable, needing only to be refueled like an airplane.

== History ==
In the 1865 Jules Verne novel From the Earth to the Moon, successful attempts are made to launch three people in a projectile with the goal of a Moon landing. In 1880, The Pall Mall Gazette described Verne’s Columbiad as a "space-ship" — the first recorded use of this term.

The concept of a "space ship" (or "rocket ship") was further developed in twentieth century science fiction such as Flash Gordon, as a self-contained, presumably rocket-powered, unitized vehicle capable of reaching an extraterrestrial destination keeping its structure intact, and requiring only refueling, like an airplane. Real-world rocket technology did not make this possible; while the airplane requires an amount of fuel occupying a relatively small fraction of the total size and mass, the rocket requires an oxidizer in order to operate in the vacuum of space. It also cannot use atmospheric air as its propellant; this function is served by the high-volume and high-mass fuel and oxidizer. Also, the high amount of energy required to reach at least low Earth orbital speed requires an extremely high proportion of propellant to dry vehicle mass. Also, mid-twentieth century structural technologies made it impossible to construct a single set of propellant tanks capable of holding enough mass to reach the required velocity. Thus, expendable multi-stage launch vehicles were the necessary design choice when spaceflight began in the late 1950s. However, starting in the 1990s, developmental work began on such unitary single-stage-to-orbit (SSTO) space vehicles with projects like X-33, Roton, McDonnell Douglas DC-X, and Skylon. By 2020, most SSTO developmental projects had failed with the exception of Skylon, which continues development.

== Current space vehicles ==
A majority of space vehicles currently in use are expendable, designed to carry a single payload into space but not for recovery and reuse. They typically consist of several stages which detach in sequence as the vehicle gains speed and altitude and propellant is exhausted.

Reusable launch systems are capable of launching multiple payloads and can be recovered after each use. The only fully reusable space vehicles currently in use are New Shepard and SpaceShipTwo. Both of them perform suborbital spaceflights. SpaceX is developing their Starship to be a fully reusable orbital space vehicle.

== See also ==
- Aircraft
