= Saturn V =

American super heavy-lift expendable rocket

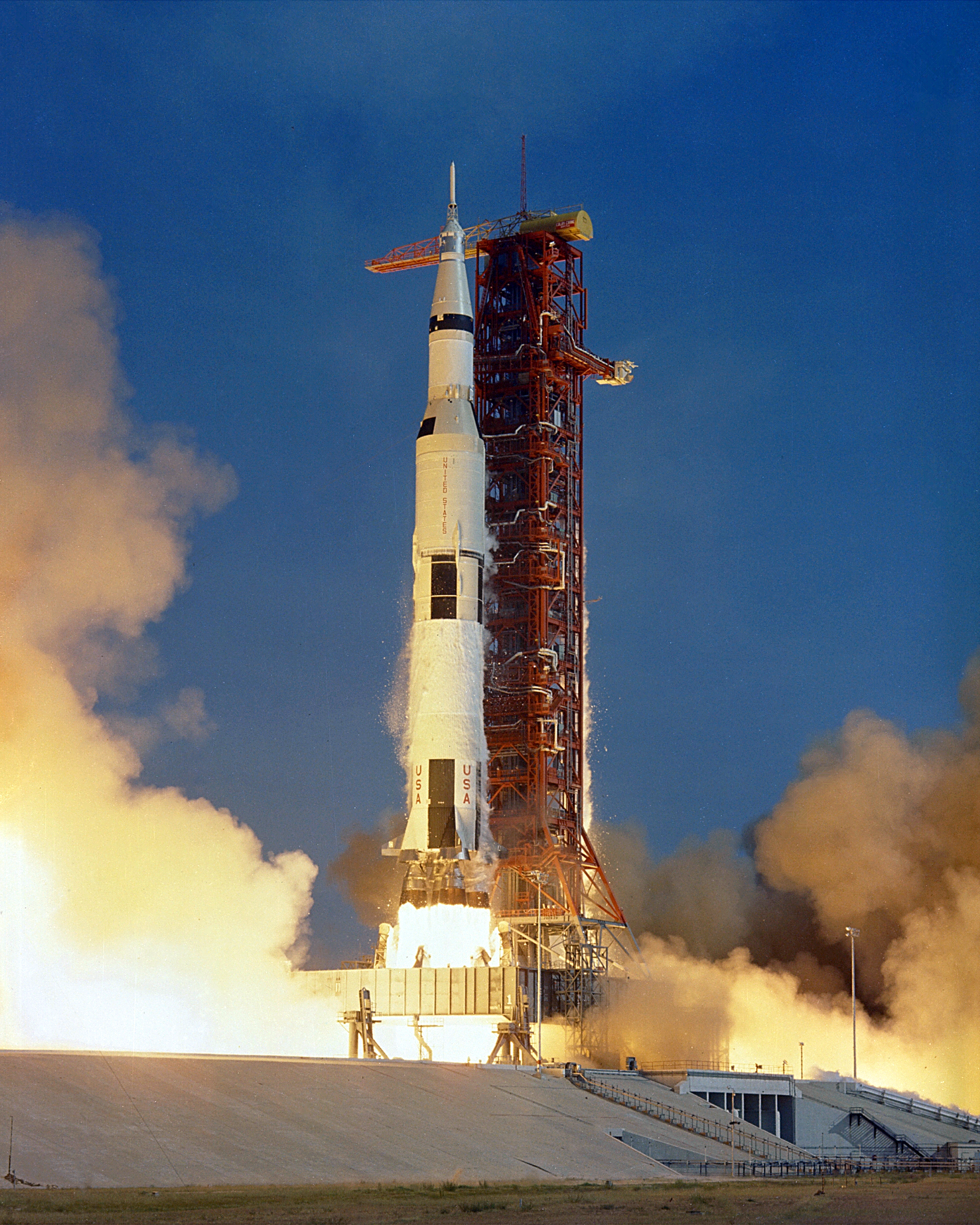
- The launch of the Apollo 11 mission on Saturn V SA-506, July 16, 1969
- Function: Launch vehicle of Apollo program and Skylab
- Manufacturer: Boeing (S-IC); North American (S-II); Douglas (S-IVB)
- Country of origin: United States
- Project cost: US$6.4 billion (equivalent to $35.5 billion in 2025)
- Cost per launch: US$185 million (equivalent to $1.02 billion in 2025)

Size
- Height: 111 m (363 ft)
- Diameter: 10 m (33 ft)
- Mass: 2,822,171 to 2,965,241 kg (6,221,823 to 6,537,238 lb)
- Stages: 3

Capacity

Payload to LEO
- Altitude: 185 km (115 mi)
- Mass: 140,000 kg (310,000 lb) (Note: Includes mass of Apollo command module, Apollo service module, Apollo Lunar Module, Spacecraft/LM Adapter, Saturn V Instrument Unit, S-IVB stage, and propellant for translunar injection)

Payload to TLI
- Mass: 43,500 kg (95,900 lb)

Associated rockets
- Family: Saturn
- Derivative work: Saturn INT-21
- Comparable: Energia; Falcon Heavy; Long March 9; N1 (never operational); SLS; Starship

Launch history
- Status: Retired
- Launch sites: Kennedy Space Center, LC-39
- Total launches: 13
- Success(es): 12
- Partial failure: 1 (Apollo 6)
- First flight: November 9, 1967 (AS-501 Apollo 4) (Note: Serial numbers were initially assigned by the Marshall Space Flight Center in the format "SA-5xx" (for Saturn-Apollo). By the time the rockets achieved flight, the Manned Spacecraft Center started using the format "AS-5xx" (for Apollo-Saturn).)
- Last flight: May 14, 1973 (AS-513 Skylab)

First stage – S-IC
- Height: 42 m (138 ft)
- Diameter: 10 m (33 ft)
- Empty mass: 137,000 kg (303,000 lb)
- Gross mass: 2,214,000 kg (4,881,000 lb)
- Powered by: 5 × F-1
- Maximum thrust: 33,000 kN (7,500,000 lbf) at sea level
- Specific impulse: 260 s (2.5 km/s) minimum at sea level
- Burn time: 150 seconds
- Propellant: LOX / RP-1

Second stage – S-II
- Height: 24.87 m (81 ft 7 in)
- Diameter: 10 m (33 ft)
- Empty mass: 43,000 kg (95,000 lb) (Note: Includes S-II/S-IVB interstage)
- Gross mass: 470,000 kg (1,037,000 lb)
- Powered by: 5 × J-2
- Maximum thrust: 4,400 kN (1,000,000 lbf) in vacuum
- Specific impulse: 424 s (4.16 km/s) (427 s (4.19 km/s) at 5:1 mixture ratio)
- Burn time: 395 seconds
- Propellant: LOX / LH_{2}

Third stage – S-IVB (Note: Not present in Skylab configuration)
- Height: 17.86 m (58 ft 7 in)
- Diameter: 6.60 m (21 ft 8 in)
- Empty mass: 15,200 kg (33,600 lb) (Note: Includes Saturn V Instrument Unit)
- Gross mass: 120,500 kg (265,600 lb)
- Powered by: 1 × J-2
- Maximum thrust: 1,000 kN (225,000 lbf) in vacuum
- Specific impulse: 424 s (4.16 km/s) (427 s (4.19 km/s) at 5:1 mixture ratio)
- Burn time: 165 + 312 seconds (2 burns)
- Propellant: LOX / LH_{2}

The Saturn V (Note: Pronounced "Saturn five". "V" is the roman numeral for 5.) is a retired American super heavy-lift launch vehicle developed by NASA under the Apollo program for human exploration of the Moon. The rocket was human-rated, had three stages, and was liquid-fueled. Thirteen Saturn V vehicles were launched, from 1967 to 1973, all from Kennedy Space Center Launch Complex 39, nine of which launched 24 astronauts toward the Moon from Apollo 8 to Apollo 17. Its final launch was Skylab, the first American space station, converted from its own third stage.

The Saturn V was the first launch vehicle to carry humans beyond low Earth orbit (LEO), with the only other to do so being the Space Launch System (SLS) for the Artemis II lunar flyby in 2026. The Saturn V holds the record for the largest payload capacity to low Earth orbit, 140,000 kg (310,000 lb), which included the S-IVB third stage with remaining propellant to send the Apollo command and service module and Lunar Module to the Moon. At 34.5 meganewtons, it is the fourth most powerful rocket by thrust at launch and the second most powerful to carry humans, after SLS at 39 meganewtons.

The largest production model of the Saturn family of rockets, the Saturn V was designed at the Marshall Space Flight Center (MSFC) in Huntsville, Alabama. The program was managed by American George Mueller; technical design was led by scientists relocated from Nazi Germany, most notably Wernher von Braun, as well as Kurt Debus and Arthur Rudolph. This group had developed the first US launch vehicles, the Redstone rocket family, under the Army Ballistic Missile Agency. All engines were built by Rocketdyne. Boeing built the kerolox S-IC first stage powered by five F-1 engines; these remain the most powerful single chamber liquid-fuelled engines ever built. North American Aviation the hydrolox S-II second stage, and Douglas Aircraft Company the hydrolox S-IVB third stage, powered by five and one J-2 engines respectively. IBM and MSFC designed the rocket's instrument unit.

The rocket first launched in the November 1967 Apollo 4 test flight. Two unused Saturn Vs were built, originally designated for Apollo 19 and 20; three ground test articles were also built. Unrealized follow-on concepts included the Saturn II, Saturn MLV, and Saturn V ELV vehicles, which could include UA120 solid rocket boosters, the Saturn C-5N using a NERVA nuclear thermal rocket third stage, and the Saturn-Shuttle. Further flights were proposed for the Skylab B space station, Voyager Mars orbiters and landers, Prospector lunar rover, and a manned Venus flyby.

== History ==
=== Background ===
In September 1945 German rocket technologist Wernher von Braun was brought, under contract, to the United States during Operation Paperclip. Operation Paperclip, authorized by President Truman, brought in over 1,600 German rocket engineers and technicians from former Nazi Germany after World War II to the United States for government employment. Von Braun, who had helped create the German V-2 rocket, was assigned to the United States Army Ordnance Corps at Fort Strong, Massachusetts, then at Fort Bliss, Texas. During his time at Fort Bliss, von Braun and his team were not given much to work with. In the first couple of months, the Germans were only given "primitive or aged" wooden workshops and were not allowed to leave Fort Bliss without a military escort. In 1950, von Braun remarked to Daniel Lang, a reporter at The New Yorker, "At Peenemünde we had been coddled, here you were counting pennies." However, he wrote books and articles in popular magazines, such as Collier's.

This approach changed in 1957, when the Soviets launched Sputnik 1 atop an R-7 ICBM, which could carry a thermonuclear warhead to the U.S. The American Army and government began putting more effort towards sending Americans into space before the Soviets. The Army turned to von Braun's team, who had created the Jupiter series of rockets. The Juno I rocket launched the first American satellite in January 1958. Von Braun considered the Jupiter series of rockets to be a prototype of the upcoming Saturn series of rockets, and referred to it as "an infant Saturn".

=== Design process ===
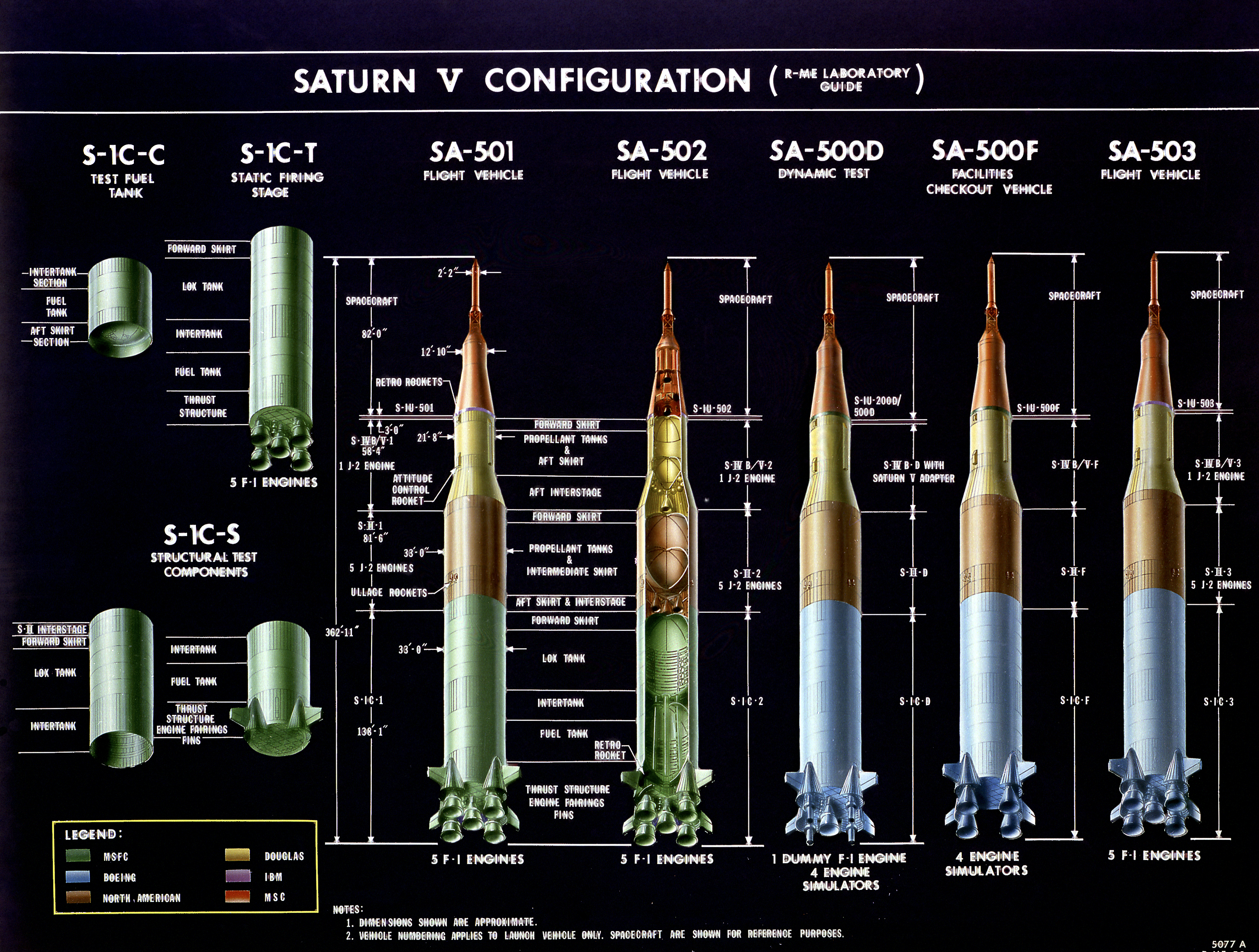
Saturn V Dynamic Test Vehicle and flight vehicle configurations

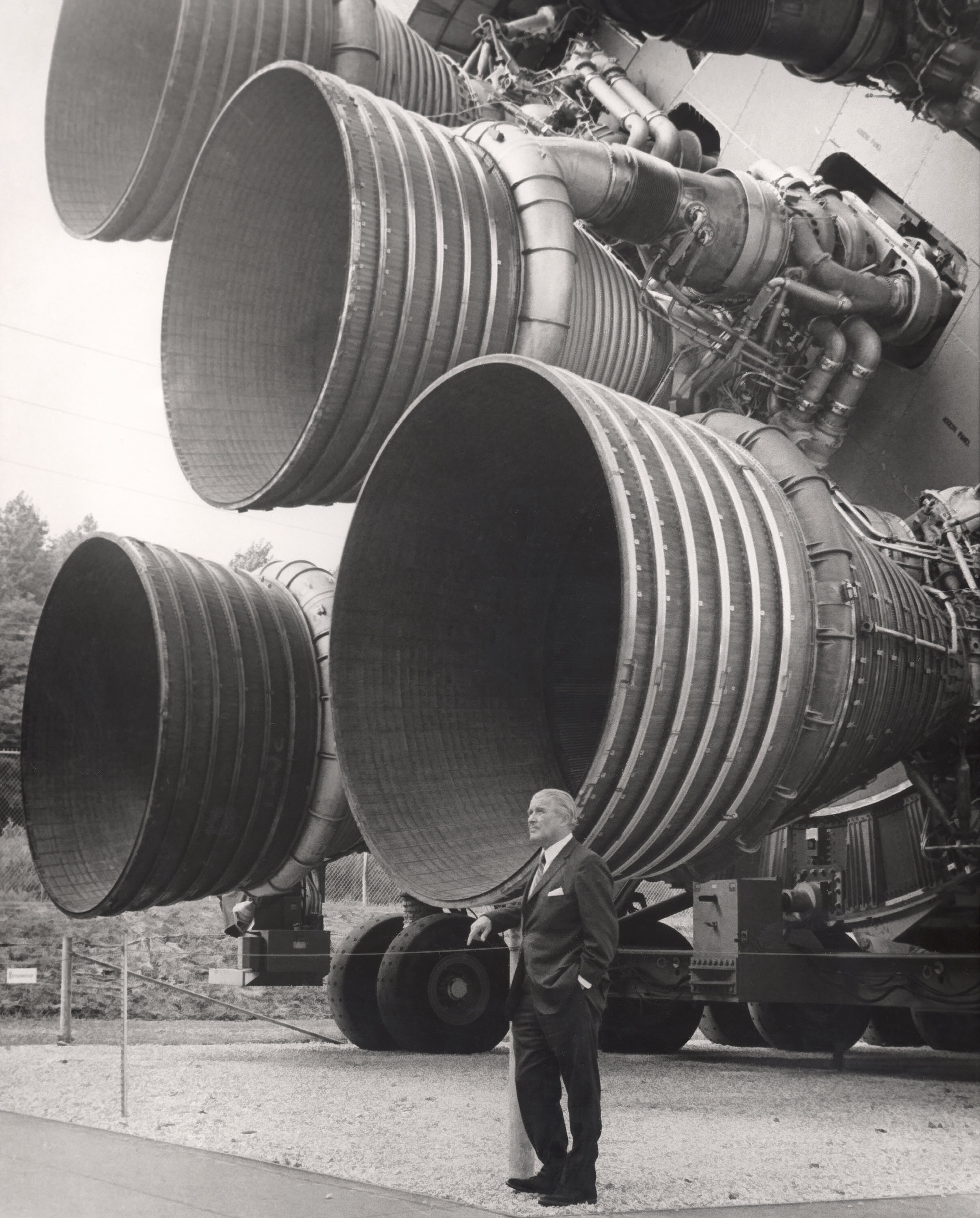
Von Braun with the F-1 engines of the Saturn V first stage at the U.S. Space and Rocket Center

The Saturn rocket family was named after the planet Saturn because the design of the various Saturn rockets evolved from the earlier Jupiter vehicles, which were named after the planet Jupiter. Between 1960 and 1962, the Marshall Space Flight Center (MSFC) designed a series of Saturn rockets that could be deployed for Earth orbit and lunar missions. NASA planned to use a Saturn vehicle as part of the Earth orbit rendezvous (EOR) method for a lunar mission. Development on the Saturn C-3 rocket was just beginning when the MSFC planned an even bigger rocket, the Saturn C-4, which would use four F-1 engines in its first stage and five J-2 engines in its second stage.

On January 25, 1962, NASA gave its approval to build the C-5. The three-stage rocket would consist of the S-IC first stage, with five F-1 engines; the S-II second stage with five J-2 engines; and the S-IVB third stage, with a single J-2 engine. The C-5 would undergo component testing even before the first model was constructed. The S-IVB third stage would be used as the second stage for the C-1B, which would serve both to demonstrate proof of concept and feasibility for the C-5 and to provide flight data critical to the development of the C-5. Rather than undergoing testing for each major component, the C-5 would be tested in an "all-up" fashion, meaning that the first test flight of the rocket would include complete versions of all three stages. By testing all components at once, far fewer test flights would be required before a crewed launch. The C-5 was confirmed as NASA's choice for the Apollo program in mid-1962, and was named the Saturn V in February 1963. In the same month, the C designations were dropped; the C-1 became the Saturn I and C-1B became Saturn IB. By November 1962, NASA had switched to and confirmed a lunar orbit rendezvous (LOR) method for a lunar mission. The outside contractors that were chosen for the construction were: Boeing (S-IC), North American Aviation (S-II), Douglas Aircraft (S-IVB), and IBM (S-IU).

=== Selection for Apollo lunar landing ===
Early in the planning process, NASA considered three methods for the Moon mission: Earth orbit rendezvous (EOR), direct ascent, and lunar orbit rendezvous (LOR). A direct ascent configuration would require an extremely large rocket to send a three-man spacecraft to land directly on the lunar surface with enough fuel to fly back to Earth. NASA proposed the Nova for this method. An EOR would launch the direct-landing spacecraft in two smaller parts which would combine in Earth orbit. A LOR mission would involve a single rocket launching two spacecraft: a mother ship, and a smaller, two-man landing module which would rendezvous back with the main spacecraft in lunar orbit. The lander would be discarded and the mother ship would return home.

Originally, in the early 1960s, when the Saturn project was transferred to NASA from the U.S. Army, direct ascent was the preferred method. At the same time, the Air Force had been developing of a lunar mission named Lunex, which would use the direct ascent method. The Space Systems Division estimated that a mission to the Moon using direct ascent could be done by 1967 at an estimated cost of $7.5 billion (equivalent to $61.8 billion in 2025). NASA dismissed both of the rendezvous methods as "dangerous and impractical." Von Braun's team had shown an interest in using the EOR method as early as 1958, arguing that smaller vehicles could be used. Around the same time, Thomas Dolan and his team from the Vought Astronautics Division became the first to study the LOR method. Although his team presented their ideas to NASA, nothing came from his proposal.

In 1960, several NASA officials, including Langley Research Center engineer John Houbolt, argued that a lunar orbit rendezvous provided the simplest landing on the Moon with the most cost–efficient launch vehicle, and the best chance to accomplish the lunar landing within the decade. Throughout 1961, Houbolt and his team went around convincing other research teams to pursue LOR, catching the attention of the chief of the Engineering Division, James Chamberlin. Although in charge of what would later become Project Gemini, he proposed using a two-man spacecraft using LOR to send a one-man lunar lander to the surface of the Moon. Although Chamberlin's plan stalled, it did mark a shift towards LOR. Houbolt also managed to convince NASA official George Low. In June 1962, von Braun announced LOR would be MSFC's choice. As more NASA officials became convinced, LOR was officially selected and announced as the mission configuration for the Apollo program on November 7, 1962 by NASA administrator James E. Webb.

=== Development ===
A boilerplate Apollo spacecraft, BP-027 was used for all configurations of dynamic testing. The boilerplate took the place of actual flight hardware. Boilerplate size, shape, mass, and center of gravity were the same, but it was not necessary for the entire Apollo spacecraft to be completed to commence dynamic testing. The boilerplate was outfitted with instrumentation to record data for engineering study and evaluation. BP-27 was accepted at the Marshall Space Flight Center in late September 1964.

The third stage, the S-IVB-D arrived at MSFC before any other Saturn V stage because it was first needed for dynamic testing of the Saturn IB rocket. The third stage arrived on January 4, 1965. Next, the instrument unit, S-IU-200D/500D, was built. Unlike the other major components of the rocket, the instrument unit was built in Huntsville, Alabama, where the MSFC is located. The ring was completed in January 1965 and electronic components from IBM installed by February 1. Like the third stage, it arrived before the other stages because it was needed for dynamic testing in the Saturn IB first.

The first stage of the Saturn V rocket, S-IC-D, set out on the maiden voyage of NASA barge Poseidon to Marshall Space Flight Center on October 6, 1965, and arrived on October 13. While the first stage was on its way, dynamic testing for the Saturn V program using the test rocket SA-500D began on October 8. The first stage was lifted into place in the dynamic test stand January 13, 1966.

The second stage of the SA-500D had a complex history. Originally, NASA wanted to use the S-II-D stage for its dynamic testing. However, in the spring of 1965, NASA canceled the production of the S-II-D stage and instead opted to use the S-II-S stage for its dynamic tests. The S-II-S stage, which North American Aviation's Space and Information Systems Division (S&ID) at Seal Beach had completed by January 31, 1965, was re-designated as S-II-S/D to be used for dynamic testing. The S-II-S/D would rupture and be destroyed during a test on September 29, 1965 at Seal Beach. It was discovered that the test was exercising a considerable margin above the structural limits required for flight, approximately 144 percent of its designed load limit. Because of this, NASA was forced to substitute the S-II-T stage for testing. In early 1966, the S-II-T was re-designated S-II-T/D, so it could be used for dynamic testing as well as engine firing. On May 28, 1966, S-II-T/D was undergoing a pressure test to find a hydrogen leak, but the hydrogen pressure sensors and switches had been disconnected unbeknownst to the second-shift crew. As a result, the crew, believing that a valve was leaking liquid hydrogen, began closing valves. This caused the liquid hydrogen tank to over pressurize and explode, injuring five men and hospitalizing two others.

After the S-II-T/D was destroyed, the S-II-F stage was assigned to dynamic test duties. The S-II-F stage was at the Kennedy Space Center being used as a non-flight version of the stage. Being shipped from Seal Beach, California, to Kennedy Space Center where it arrived March 4. The S-II-F, now designated S-II-F/D, arrived at the MSFC on November 10, 1966.

=== Testing ===
Dynamic testing examined "the vehicle's response to lateral, longitudinal, and torsional excitation, simulating those that would be experienced in flight. The vehicle was "mounted on a hydrodynamic support system made up of four hydraulic/pneumatic pedestals to permit a simulated unrestrained reaction." Engineers tested vibrations in one plane at a time with different amounts of ballast simulating "fuel load at critical time points in the flight trajectory."

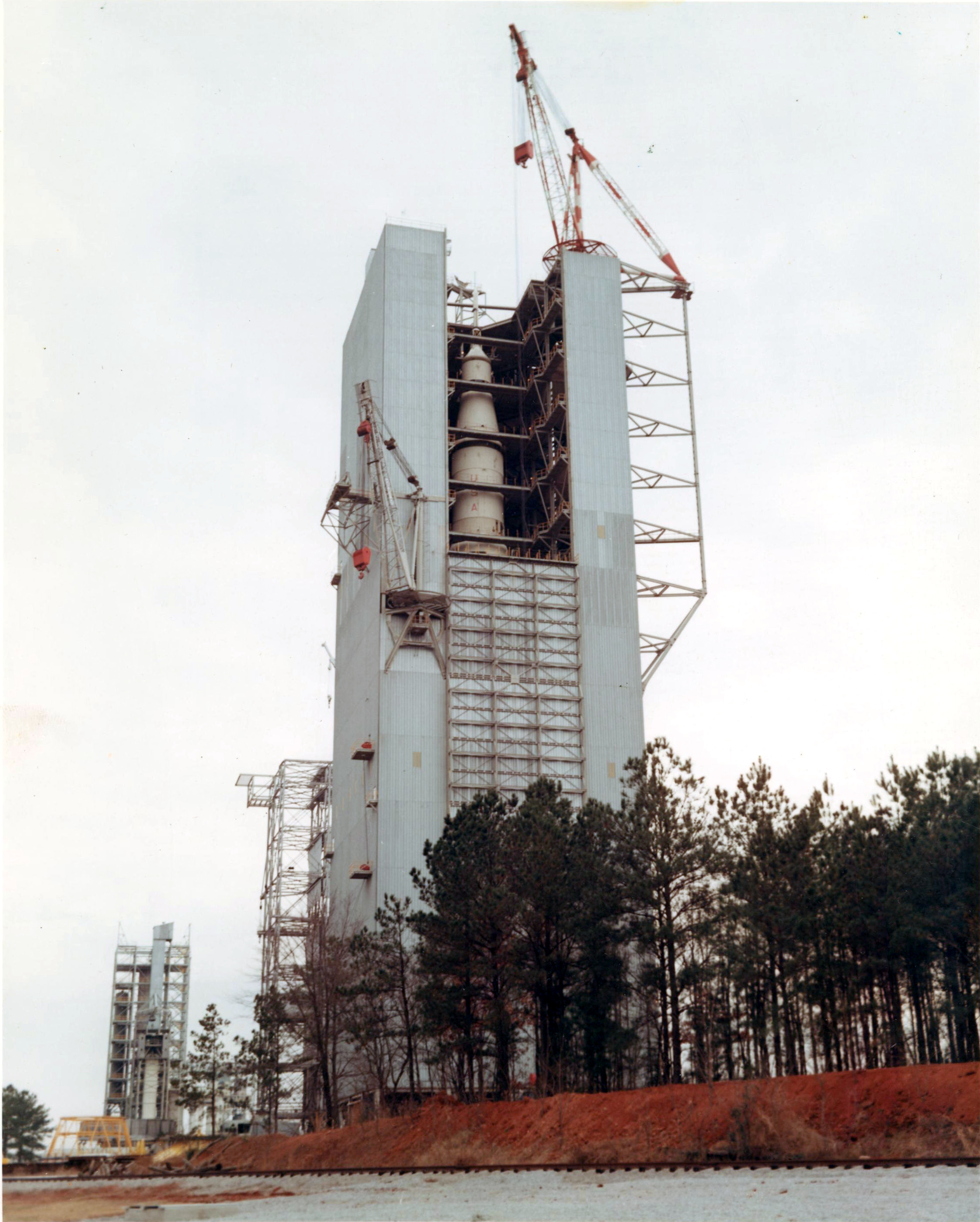
In Configuration One, SA-500D was fully assembled inside the dynamic test facility.

Dynamic tests were conducted in three configurations, one for each phase of Saturn V-powered flight. Configuration I tested the entire stack for its bending and vibration characteristics, as if the vehicle had just been launched. Configuration II tested the stack as if the first stage had jettisoned and the second stage were firing, and configuration III tested only the third stage and Apollo spacecraft. Tests began with Configuration III in the Saturn IB dynamic test facility. Configuration III testing took place in late 1965. Configuration I testing followed in the Saturn V dynamic test stand, then Configuration II in the same place. With all the components at MSFC as of November 10, 1966, the second stage was stacked atop the first inside the dynamic test stand on November 23. The third stage was added to the stack November 30, and the Instrument Unit and boilerplate Apollo were installed in December. The rocket was stacked and ready for "Configuration One" testing.

Configuration One Testing finished on March 11. Testing produced "several minor irregularities indicating the need for possible engineering changes" Configuration Two testing followed; in which the first stage was removed from the stack to simulate conditions after the first stage had jettisoned. On August 3, 1967, MSFC announced the successful completion of the dynamic test program, thereby declaring the dynamics and structures of the Saturn V ready for its first launch later in the year. The dynamic testing resulted in "several slight modifications" to the final flight vehicle.

=== Launch history ===
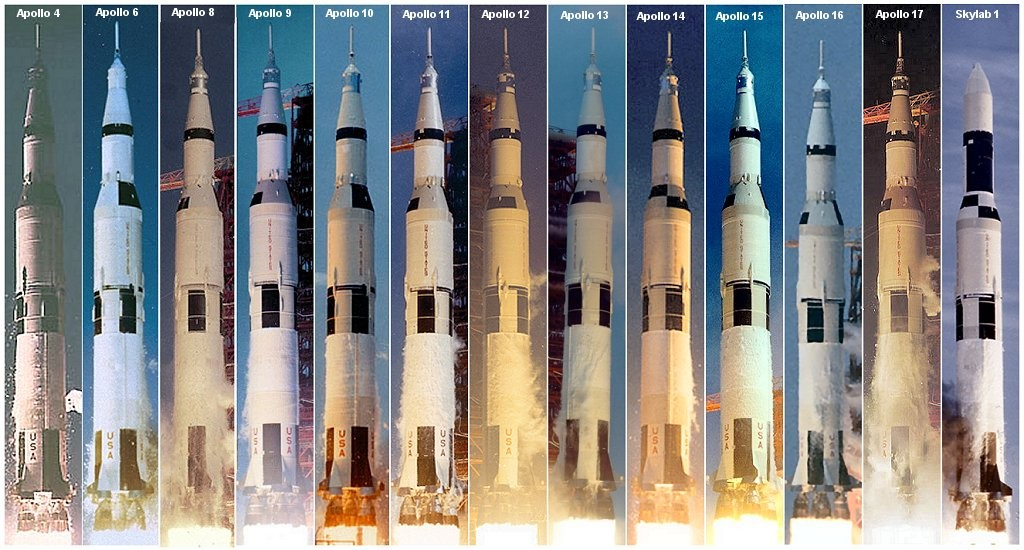
All Saturn V launches, 1967–1973

Serial number	Mission	Launch date	Notes	Refs
SA-500F	Facilities integration		Used as a facility verification vehicle. The first stage was scrapped. The second stage was converted to S-II-F/D and was used for dynamic testing. It was later moved to the U.S. Space & Rocket Center where it currently sits. The third stage was modified into a Skylab dynamic test article before it was scrapped.	
SA-500D	Dynamic testing		Used to evaluate the vehicle's response to vibrations. On display at the U.S. Space & Rocket Center.	
S-IC-T	All Systems Test		First stage used for static firing tests of S-IC stage and of F-1 engines at Marshall Space Flight Center. On display at Kennedy Space Center.	
SA-501	Apollo 4	November 9, 1967; 12:00:01 UTC	First uncrewed, all-up test flight.	
SA-502	Apollo 6	April 4, 1968; 12:00:01 UTC	Second uncrewed test flight; J-2 engine problems caused early shutdown of two engines in the second stage, and prevented third stage restart.	
SA-503	Apollo 8	December 21, 1968; 12:51:00 UTC	First crewed flight; first trans-lunar injection of Apollo command and service module.	
SA-504	Apollo 9	March 3, 1969; 16:00:00 UTC	Crewed low Earth orbit test of the complete Apollo spacecraft with the Lunar Module (LM).	
SA-505	Apollo 10	May 18, 1969; 16:49:00 UTC	Second crewed trans-lunar injection of the complete Apollo spacecraft with LM; Only Saturn V launched from Pad 39B.	
SA-506	Apollo 11	July 16, 1969; 13:32:00 UTC	First crewed lunar landing, at Sea of Tranquility.	
SA-507	Apollo 12	November 14, 1969; 16:22:00 UTC	Vehicle was struck twice by lightning shortly after liftoff, but did not suffer serious damage. Made second crewed lunar landing, near Surveyor 3 at Ocean of Storms	
SA-508	Apollo 13	April 11, 1970; 19:13:00 UTC	Severe pogo oscillations in second stage caused early center engine shutdown; guidance compensated by burning remaining engines longer. Lunar landing mission was aborted by service module failure.	
SA-509	Apollo 14	January 31, 1971; 21:03:02 UTC	Third crewed lunar landing, near Fra Mauro, Apollo 13's intended landing site.	
SA-510	Apollo 15	July 26, 1971; 13:34:00 UTC	Fourth crewed lunar landing, at Hadley–Apennine. First extended Apollo mission, carrying lunar orbital Scientific Instrument Module and Lunar Roving Vehicle.	
SA-511	Apollo 16	April 16, 1972; 17:54:00 UTC	Fifth crewed lunar landing, at Descartes Highlands.	
SA-512	Apollo 17	December 7, 1972; 05:33:00 UTC	Only night launch. Sixth and final crewed lunar landing, at Taurus–Littrow.	
SA-513	Skylab 1	May 14, 1973; 17:30:00 UTC	Uncrewed launch of the Skylab orbital workshop, which replaced the third stage, S-IVB-513, on display at Johnson Space Center. Originally designated for canceled Apollo 18.	
SA-514	Unused		Originally designated for canceled Apollo 19. Never used. First stage on display at Johnson Space Center. Second and third stage on display at Kennedy Space Center.	
SA-515	Unused		Originally designated for canceled Apollo 20 and later designated as a backup Skylab launch vehicle, never used. The first stage was on display at Michoud Assembly Facility, until June 2016 then was moved to the INFINITY Science Center in Mississippi for preservation. The second stage is on display at Johnson Space Center. The third stage was converted to a backup Skylab orbital workshop and is on display at the National Air and Space Museum.	

== Specifications ==
Saturn V diagram

The size and payload capacity of the Saturn V dwarfed those of all other previous rockets successfully flown at that time. With the Apollo spacecraft on top, the Saturn V stood 363 ft (111 m) tall, and, ignoring the fins, had a diameter of 33 ft (10 m) at its base. Fully fueled, the Saturn V had a mass of 2,822,171 to 2,965,241 kg (6,221,823 to 6,537,238 lb), with a low Earth orbit (LEO) payload capacity of about 140,000 kg (310,000 lb), and could send about 43,500 kg (95,900 lb) to the Moon.

The Saturn V was primarily designed by the Marshall Space Flight Center in Huntsville, Alabama. The rocket used the powerful F-1 and J-2 rocket engines. When all five F-1 engines of the first stage were tested together at the Stennis Space Center, their low-frequency roar shattered the plate-glass window of a bank building in Picayune, 15 miles away. Designers decided early on to attempt to use as much technology from the Saturn I program as possible for the Saturn V. Consequently, the S-IVB third stage of the Saturn V was based on the S-IVB second stage of the Saturn I. The Saturn V was primarily constructed of aluminum, titanium, polyurethane, cork and asbestos. Blueprints and other plans of the rocket are available on microfilm at the Marshall Space Flight Center.

The Saturn V consisted of three stages—the S-IC first stage, S-II second stage, S-IVB third stage, and the instrument unit. All three stages used liquid oxygen (LOX) as the oxidizer. The first stage used RP-1 for fuel, while the second and third stages used liquid hydrogen (LH2). LH2 has a higher specific energy (energy per unit mass) than RP-1, which makes it more suitable for higher-energy orbits, such as the trans-lunar injection required for Apollo missions. Conversely, RP-1 offers higher energy density (energy per unit volume) and higher thrust than LH2, which makes it more suitable for reducing aerodynamic drag and gravity losses in the early stages of launch. If the first stage had used LH2, the volume required would have been greater, which would have been aerodynamically infeasible at the time. The second and third stages also used small solid-propellant ullage motors that helped to separate the stages during the launch to ensure proper positioning of the liquid propellants for pump intake.

=== S-IC first stage ===
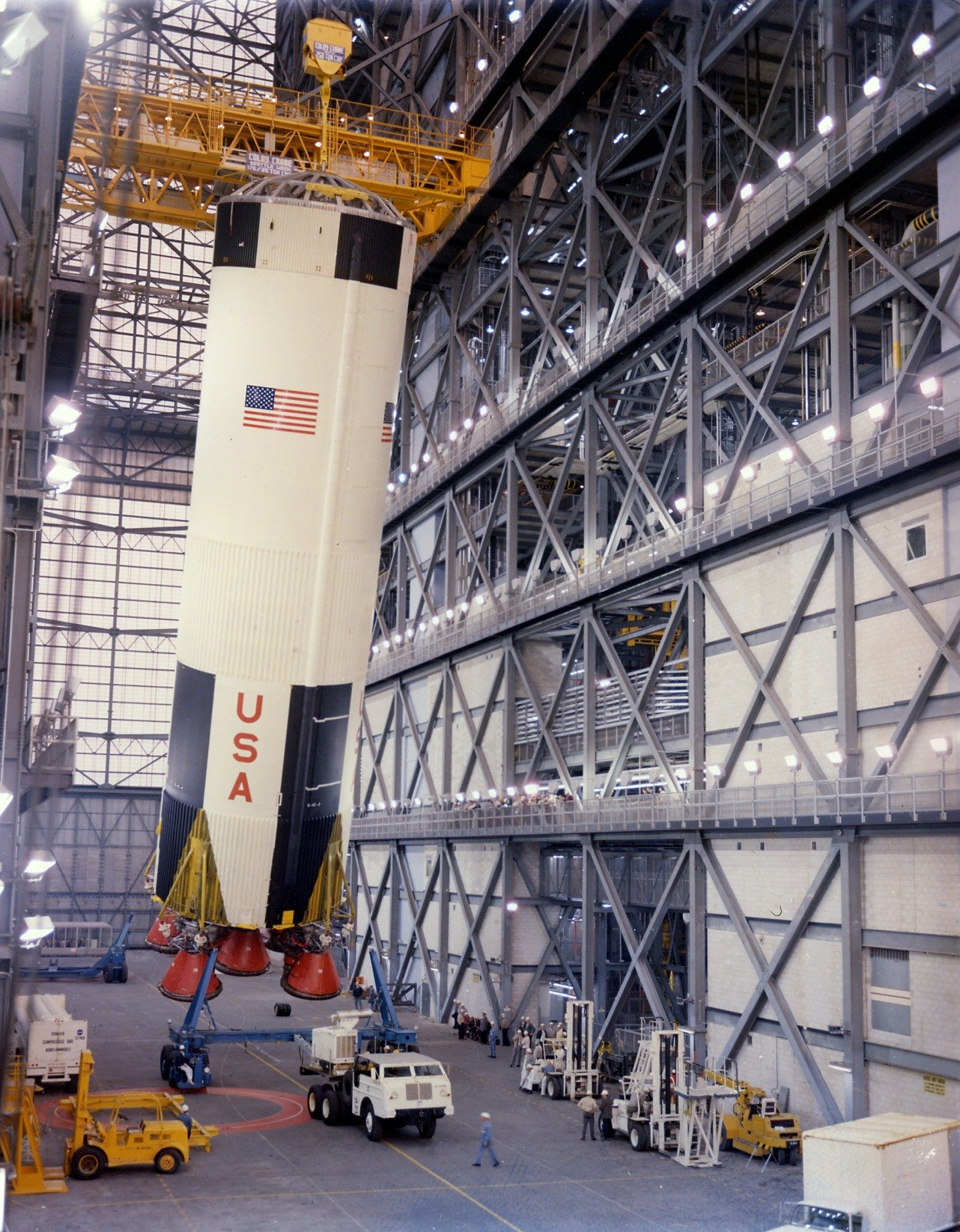
The first stage of Apollo 8 Saturn V being erected in the VAB on February 1, 1968

The S-IC was built by the Boeing Company at the Michoud Assembly Facility, New Orleans, and the Mississippi Test Facility (now known as the Stennis Space Center), Hancock County, Mississippi. Most of its launch mass was propellant: RP-1 fuel with liquid oxygen as the oxidizer. The stage was 42 m (138 ft) tall and 10 m (33 ft) in diameter. It provided 33,000 kN (7,500,000 lbf) of thrust at sea level. The S-IC had a dry mass of about 137,000 kg (303,000 lb). When fully fueled at launch, it had a total mass of 2,214,000 kg (4,881,000 lb). The S-IC was powered by five Rocketdyne F-1 engines arrayed in a quincunx. The center engine was fixed, while the four outer engines were hydraulically turned with gimbals to steer the rocket. The S-IC had a burn time of approximately 150 seconds.

==== Structure ====
The S-IC structure design reflects the requirements of the F-1 engines, propellants, control, instrumentation, and interfacing systems. The stage is primarily built of aluminum alloy, specifically 7075 and 2219 aluminum alloys. The major components are the forward skirt, oxidizer tank, intertank section, fuel tank, and thrust structure. The aft end of the forward skirt is attached to the oxidizer (liquid oxygen) tank and the forward end interfaces with the S-II. The skin panels, fabricated from 7075 aluminum, are stiffened and strengthened by ring frames and stringers.

The 1,310,000 L (345,000 U.S. gal) liquid oxygen tank is the structural link between the forward skirt and the intertank section. Ring baffles attached to the skin stiffeners stabilize the tank wall and serve to reduce liquid oxygen sloshing. The tank is made of 2219 aluminum alloy and is a cylinder with ellipsoidal upper and lower bulkheads. The skin thickness is tapered in eight steps from 0.65 cm (0.254 in) at the aft section to 0.48 cm (0.190 in) at the forward section. The intertank structure helps provide structural continuity between the liquid oxygen and fuel tanks. The skin panels and ring frames are fabricated from 7075 aluminum.

The 820,000 L (216,000 U.S. gal) fuel tank provides the structural link between the thrust and intertank structures. It is cylindrical with ellipsoidal upper and lower bulkheads. Anti-slosh ring baffles are located on the inside wall of the tank and anti-vortex cruciform baffles are located in the lower bulkhead area. Five liquid oxygen ducts run from the liquid oxygen tank, through the RP-1 tank, and terminate at the F-1 engines. The 2219 aluminum skin thickness is decreased in four steps from 0.49 cm (0.193 in) at the aft section to 0.43 cm (0.170 in) at the forward section.

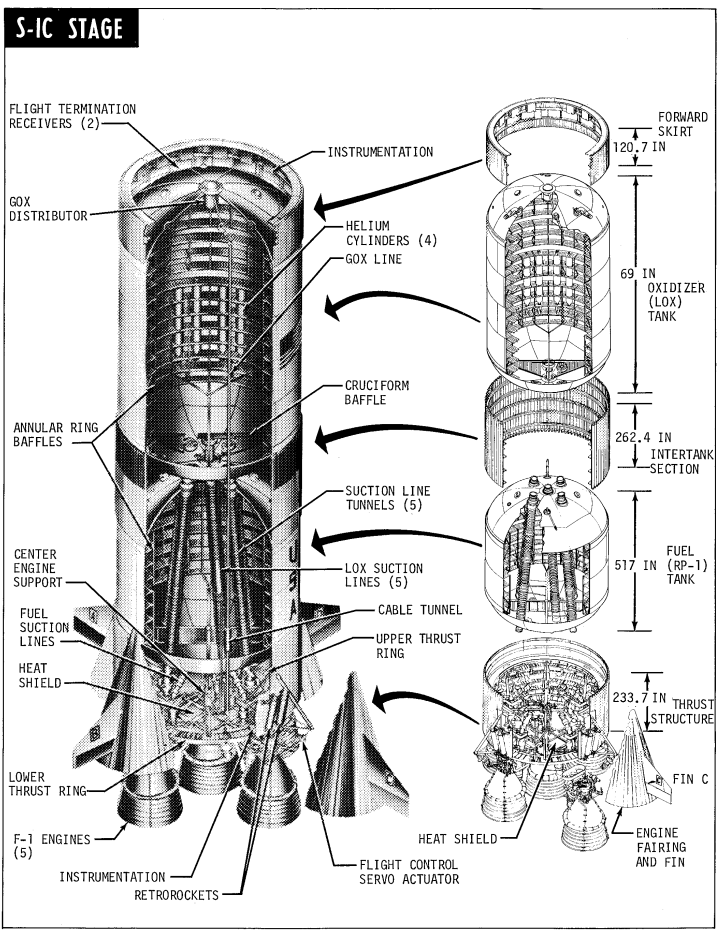
Cutaway diagram of the S-IC

The thrust structure assembly redistributes the loads of the five F-1 engines to the periphery of the fuel tank. It also provides support for the engine accessories, base heat shield, engine fairings and fins, propellant lines, retrorockets, and environmental control ducts. The lower thrust ring has four holddown points, which support the fully loaded rocket and, as necessary, restrain the vehicle from lifting off at full F-1 engine thrust. The skin segments are fabricated from 7075 aluminum alloy.

==== Electrical and instrumentation systems ====
The electrical power system of the S-IC is divided into three basic subsystems: an operational power subsystem, a measurement power subsystem, and a visual instrumentation power subsystem. On-board power is supplied by five 28-volt batteries, one each for the operational and measurement power systems. The operational power system battery supplies power to operational loads such as valve controls, purge and venting systems, pressurization systems, sequencing systems, and flight control. The measurement power system battery supplies power to measurement loads such as telemetry systems, transducers, multiplexers, and transmitters. Both batteries supply power to their loads through a common main power distributor, but each system is completely isolated from the others. In the visual instrumentation system, two batteries provide power for the liquid-oxygen tank strobe lights, while a third battery energizes the control circuits, camera motors, and thrusters of the film-camera portion of the visual instrumentation system.

The instrumentation system monitors functional operations of stage systems and provides signals for vehicle tracking during the S-IC burn. Prior to liftoff, measurements were telemetered by coaxial cable to ground support equipment. During flight, data is transmitted to ground stations over radio frequency (RF) links. The offset Doppler (ODOP) system uses the Doppler principle to provide vehicle position and acceleration data during flight.

=== S-II second stage ===
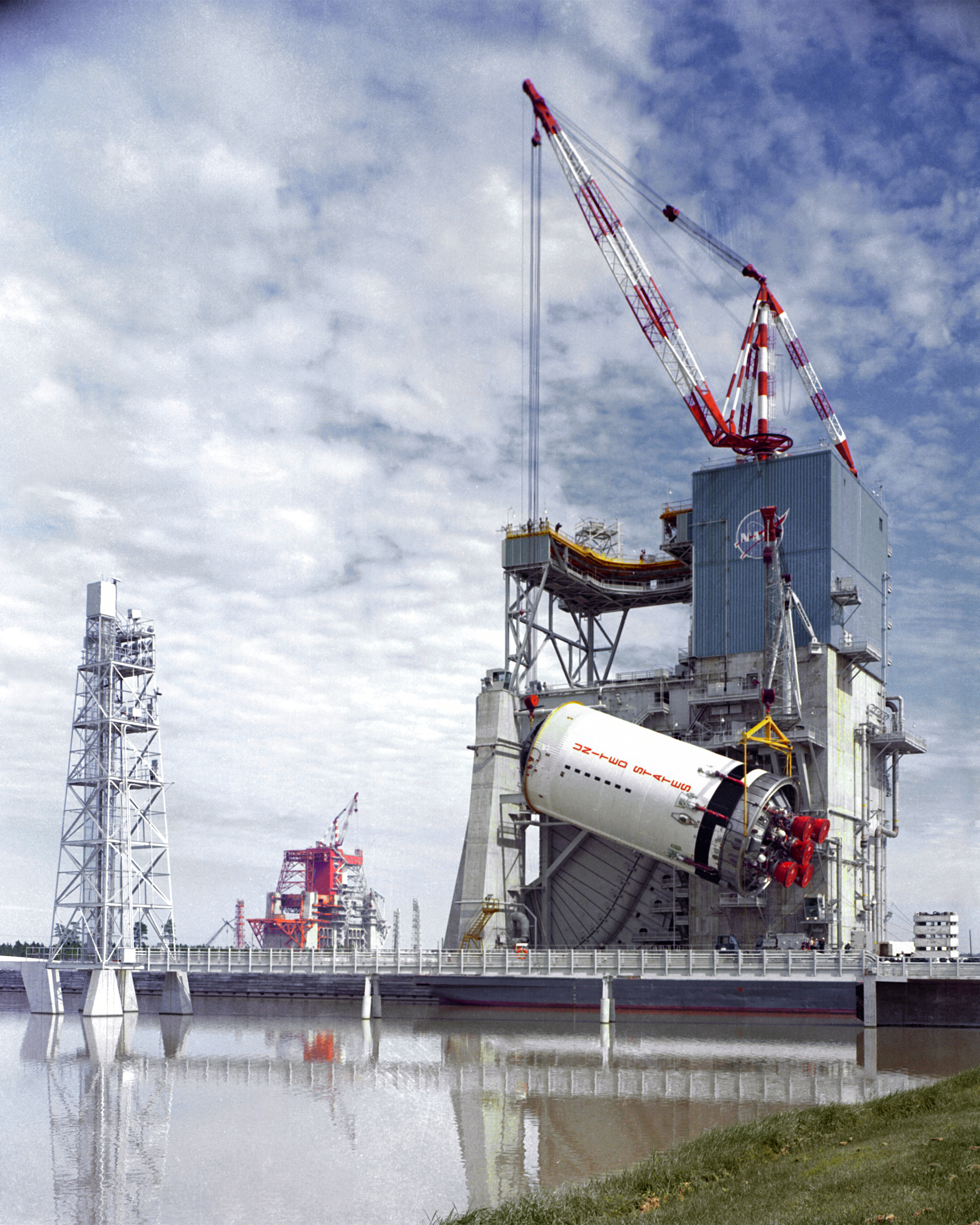
An S-II stage hoisted onto the A-2 test stand at the Mississippi Test Facility

The S-II was built by North American Aviation at Seal Beach, California. Using liquid hydrogen and liquid oxygen, it had five Rocketdyne J-2 engines arranged similarly to the S-IC, and also used the four outer engines for control. The S-II was 24.87 m (81 ft 7 in) tall with a diameter of 10 m (33 ft), identical to the S-IC. The S-II had a dry mass of about 43,000 kg (95,000 lb); when fully fueled, it weighed 470,000 kg (1,037,000 lb). The second stage accelerated the Saturn V through the upper atmosphere with 4,400 kN (1,000,000 lbf) of thrust in a vacuum. The S-II had a burn time of 395 seconds. When loaded with fuel, more than 90 percent of the mass of the stage was propellant.

==== Structure ====
The S-II consisted of a body shell structure (forward and aft skirts and interstage), a propellant tank structure (liquid hydrogen and liquid oxygen tanks), and a thrust structure. The three are of the same basic design except that the aft skirt and interstage were generally of heavier construction because of higher structural loads placed on them. Each unit is a cylindrical shell of semi-monocoque construction, built of 7075 aluminum alloy material, stiffened by external hat-section stringers and stabilized internally by circumferential ring frames. The forward skirt has a basic skin thickness of 0.10 cm (0.040 in), while the aft skirt and interstage both have basic skin thicknesses of 0.18 cm (0.071 in).

The thrust structure, like the body shell structure, is of semi-monocoque construction but in the form of a truncated cone increasing in size from approximately 5.5 metres (18 ft) to 10 metres (33 ft) in diameter. It is stiffened by circumferential ring frames and hat-section stringers like the body shell structure. Four pairs of thrust longerons (two at each outboard engine location) and a center engine support beam distribute the thrust loads of the J-2 engines. The shell structure is of 7075 aluminum alloy. A fiberglass honeycomb heat shield, supported from the lower portion of the thrust structure, protects the stage base area from excessive temperatures.

The liquid hydrogen tank consists of a long cylinder with a concave modified ellipsoidal bulkhead forward and a convex modified ellipsoidal bulkhead aft. The aft bulkhead is also used by the liquid oxygen tank. The liquid hydrogen tank wall is composed of six cylindrical sections. Wall sections and bulkheads are all fabricated from 2014 aluminum alloy and are joined together by fusion welding. The forward bulkhead has an 11 m (36 ft) diameter wide access manhole built into its center. The common bulkhead is an adhesive-bonded sandwich assembly employing facing sheets of 2014 aluminum alloy and fiberglass/phenolic honeycomb core to prevent heat transfer and retain the cryogenic properties of the two fluids to which it was exposed.

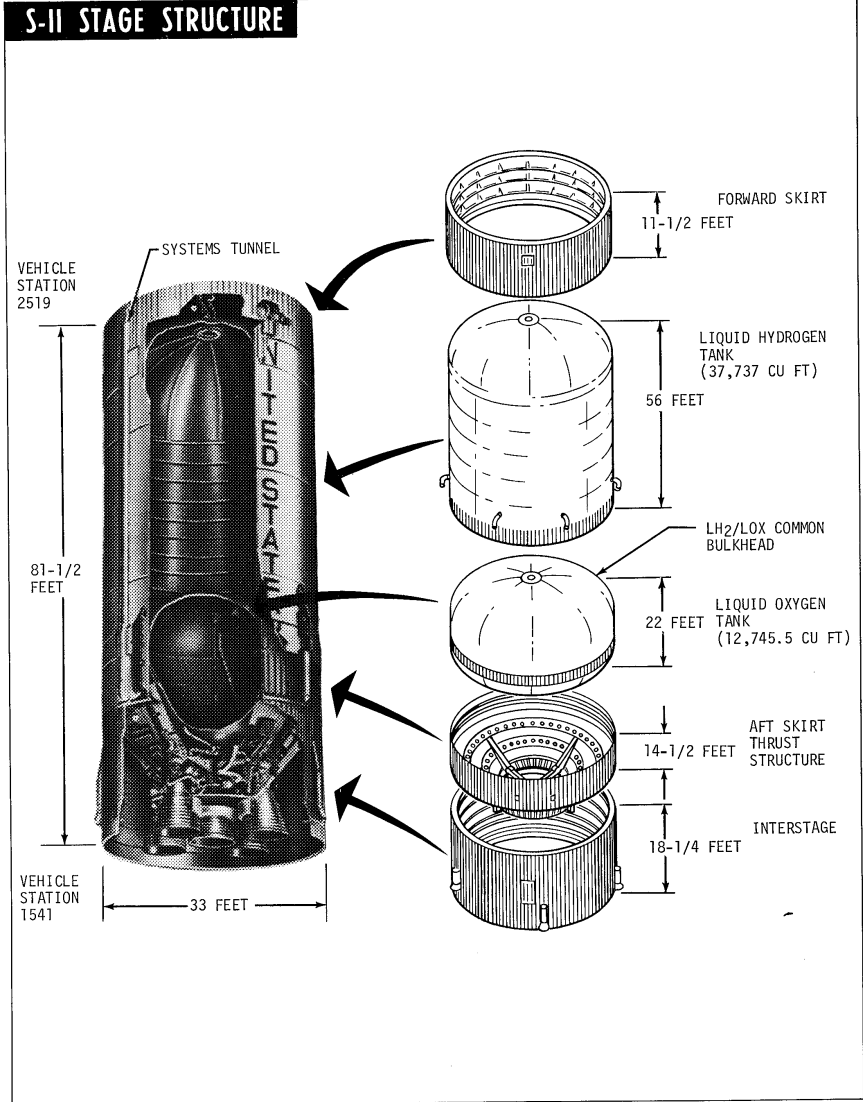
Cutaway diagram of the S-II

The liquid oxygen tank consists of ellipsoidal fore and aft halves. The tank is fitted with three ring-type slosh baffles to control propellant sloshing and minimize surface disturbances and cruciform baffles to prevent the generation of vortices at the tank outlet ducts and to minimize residuals. A six-port sump assembly located at the lowest point of the tank provides a fill and drain opening and openings for five engine feed lines.

==== Electrical and instrumentation systems ====
The S-II electrical system consists of the electrical power and electrical control subsystems. The electrical power system provides the stage with the electrical power source and distribution. The electrical power system consists of six DC bus systems and a ground supplied AC bus system. In flight, the electrical power system busses are energized by four zinc-silver oxide batteries. The electrical control system interfaces with the instrument unit (IU) to accomplish the mission requirements of the stage. The Launch Vehicle Digital Computer (LVDC) in the IU controls in-flight sequencing of stage functions through the stage switch selector. The stage switch selector can provide up to 112 individual outputs in response to the appropriate commands. These outputs are routed through the stage electrical sequence controller or the separation controller to accomplish the directed operation.

The S-II instrumentation system consists of both operational and R&D measurement and telemetry systems. The measurement system monitors and measures conditions on the stage while the telemetry system transmits this information to ground stations. The measurement system consists of transducers, signal conditioners, and distribution equipment necessary to provide the required measurement ranges and to present suitably scaled signals to the telemetry system. The measurement system monitors numerous stage conditions and characteristics. This data is processed and conditioned into a form acceptable to the telemetry systems. The telemetry system accepts the signals produced by the measuring portion of the instrumentation system and transmits them to the ground stations. Telemetry equipment includes signal multiplexers, subcarrier oscillators, amplifiers, modulators, transmitters, RF power amplifiers, RF multiplexers and an omni-directional system of four antennas.

=== S-IVB third stage ===
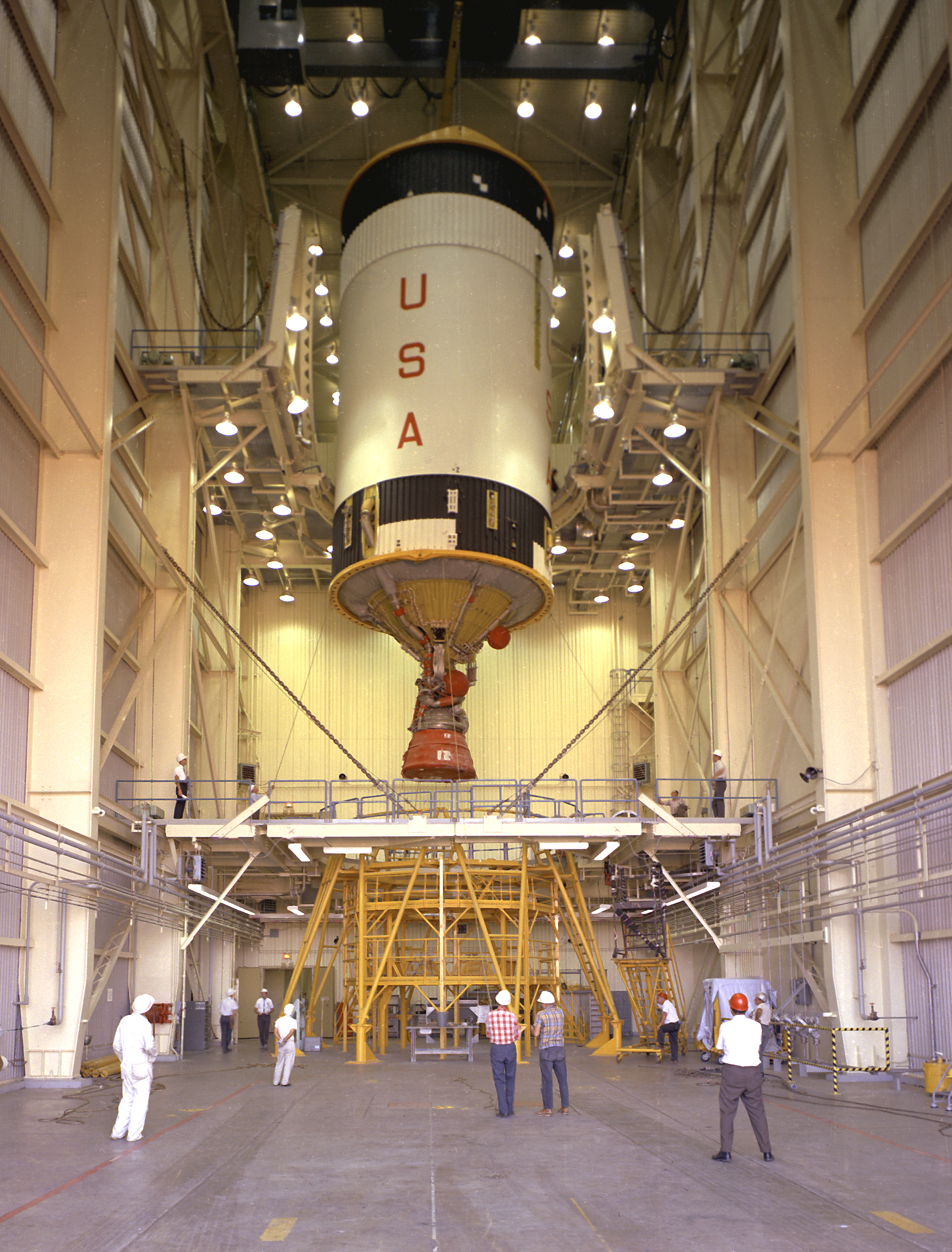
An S-IVB being moved out of NASA's Vehicle Assembly Building

The S-IVB stage was built by Douglas Aircraft Company at Huntington Beach, California. It had one Rocketdyne J-2 engine and used liquid hydrogen and liquid oxygen. The S-IVB used a common bulkhead to separate the two tanks. It was 17.86 m (58 ft 7 in) tall with a diameter of 6.60 m (21 ft 8 in) and was also designed with high mass efficiency, though not quite as aggressively as the S-II. The S-IVB had a dry mass of about 15,200 kg (33,600 lb) and, when fully fueled, weighed about 120,500 kg (265,600 lb). The S-IVB had a burn time of 165 seconds the first burn, and 312 seconds for the second burn. Its single J-2 engine produced 1,000 kN (225,000 lbf) of thrust.

==== Structure ====
The S-IVB consists of the following structural assemblies: the forward skirt, propellant tanks, aft skirt, thrust structure, and aft interstage. These assemblies, with the exception of the propellant tanks, are all of a skin/stringer type aluminum alloy airframe construction. In addition, there are two longitudinal tunnels which house wiring, pressurization lines, and propellant dispersion systems. The tunnel covers are made of aluminum stiffened by internal ribs. The forward skirt, cylindrical in shape, extends forward from the intersection of the liquid hydrogen tank sidewall and the forward dome, providing a hard attach point for the instrument unit (IU). It is the load supporting member between the liquid hydrogen tank and the IU. An access door in the IU allows servicing of the equipment in the forward skirt.

The thrust structure assembly is an inverted, truncated cone attached at its large end to the aft dome of the liquid oxygen tank and attached at its small end to the engine mount. It provides the attach point for the J-2 engine and distributes the engine thrust over the entire tank circumference. Attached externally to the thrust structure are the engine piping, wiring and interface panels, eight ambient helium spheres, hydraulic system, oxygen/hydrogen burner, and some of the engine and liquid oxygen tank instrumentation.

The propellant tank is cylindrical with a hemispherical dome at each end, and a common bulkhead to separate the liquid oxygen from the liquid hydrogen. This bulkhead is of sandwich type construction consisting of two parallel hemispherical shaped 2014 aluminum alloy domes bonded to and separated by a fiberglass-phenolic honeycomb core. The internal surface of the liquid hydrogen tank is machine-milled in a waffle pattern to obtain required tank stiffness with minimum structural weight. Attached to the inside of the liquid hydrogen tank are: a 10 m (34 ft) propellant utilization probe, nine cold helium spheres, brackets with temperature and level sensors, a chill-down pump, a slosh baffle, a slosh deflector, and fill, pressurization and vent pipes. Attached to the inside of the liquid oxygen tank are slosh baffles, a chill-down pump, a 4.1 m (13.5 ft) propellant utilization probe, temperature and level sensors, and fill, pressurization, and vent pipes. Attached externally to the propellant tank are helium pipes, propellant dispersion components, and wiring which passes through two tunnel fairings.

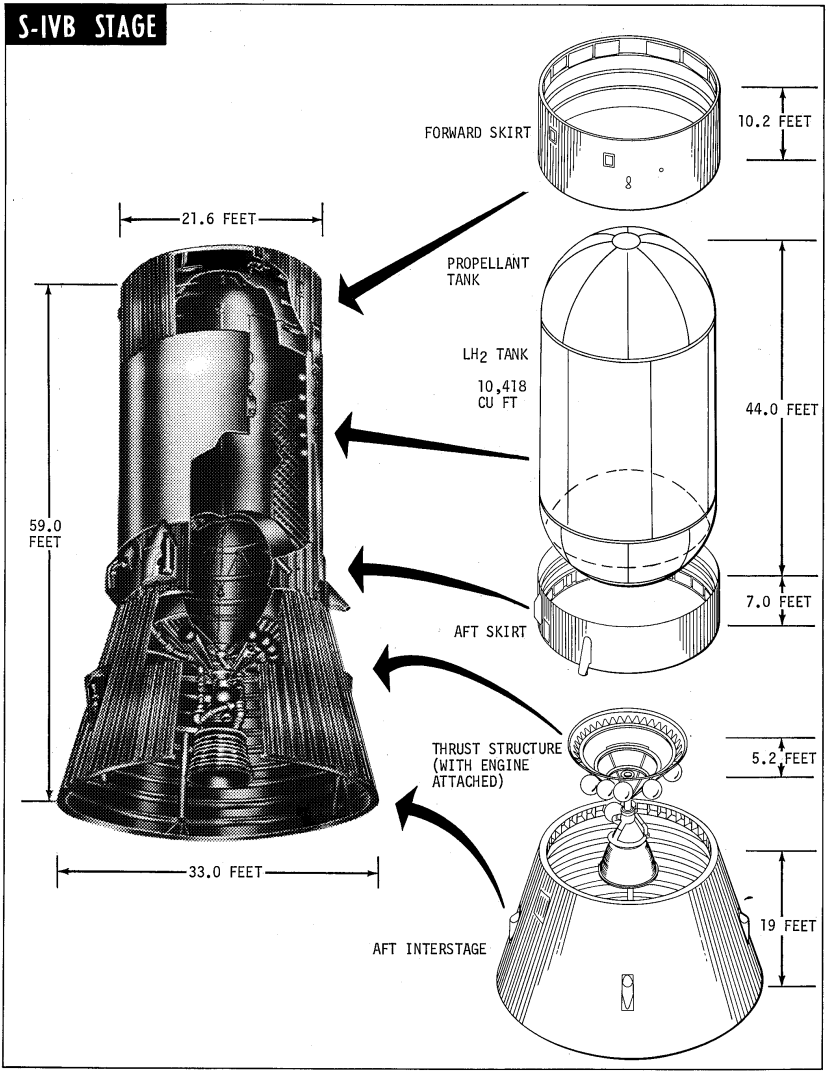
Cutaway diagram of the S-IVB stage

==== Electrical and instrumentation systems ====
The electrical system of the S-IVB consists of two major subsystems: the electrical power subsystem which consists of all power sources on the stage; and the electrical control subsystem which distributes power and control signals to various loads throughout the stage. On-board power is supplied by four zinc/silver-oxide batteries. Two are located in the forward equipment area and two in the aft equipment area. These batteries are activated during the final pre-launch preparations. Heaters and instrumentation probes are an integral part of each battery. The electrical control subsystem function is to distribute the command signals required to control the electrical components of the stage. The major components of the electrical control subsystem are the power and control distributors, the sequencer assemblies, and the pressure sensing and control devices.

The S-IVB instrumentation monitors functional operations of stage systems. Before liftoff, measurements are telemetered by coaxial cable to ground support equipment. During flight, radio frequency antennae convey data to ground stations, similar to the other two stages. The telemetry system consists of a pulse-code-modulator (PCM) digital data acquisition system (DDAS) for pre-launch checkout. The stage also contains a PCM frequency modulated (PCM/FM) system, a FM/FM system, and a single sideband (SS/FM) system for launch information. The radio frequency (RF) subsystem consists of a PCM-RF assembly, bi-directional coupler, RF detectors, DC amplifiers, coaxial switch, dummy load, RF power divider, and associated cabling. Omnidirectional antenna pattern coverage is provided by the folded-sleeve dipoles. The effective radiating power of the system is 20 watts nominal and 16 watts minimum.

=== Instrument unit ===
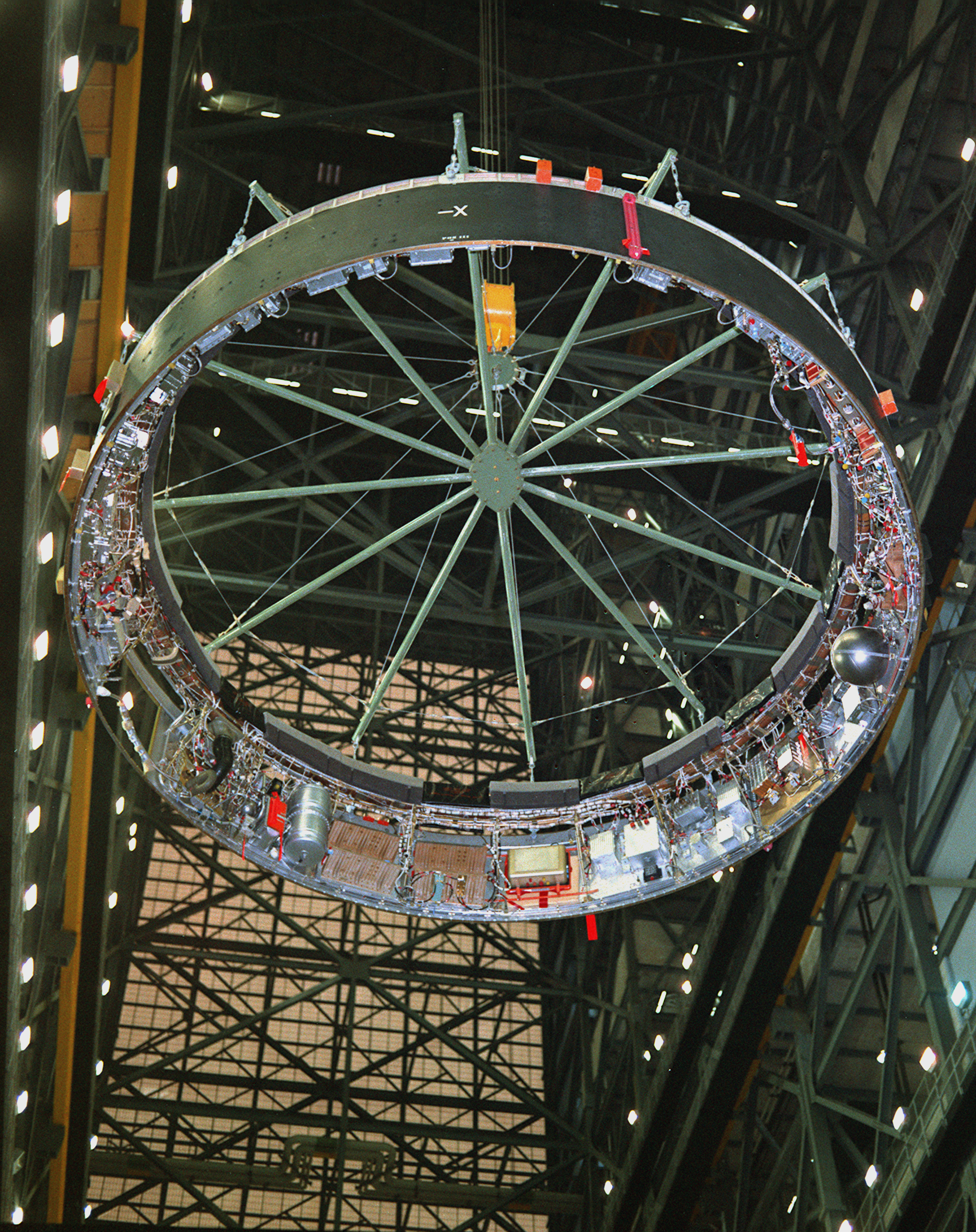
The instrument unit for the Apollo 4 Saturn V

The Instrument Unit (IU) is a cylindrical structure installed on top of the S-IVB. The IU contains the guidance, navigation, and control equipment. In addition, it contains telemetry, communications, tracking, and crew safety systems, along with their supporting electrical power and environmental control systems. Developed from the Saturn I IU, the Saturn V's IU was designed by the Marshall Space Flight Center and built by IBM at their Huntsville, Alabama facility. The basic IU structure is a short cylinder fabricated of an aluminum alloy honeycomb sandwich material. The structure is fabricated from three honeycomb sandwich segments of equal length. The top and bottom edges are made from extruded aluminum channels bonded to the honeycomb sandwich. This type of construction was selected for its high strength-to-weight ratio, acoustical insulation, and thermal conductivity properties. The cylinder is manufactured in three 120-degree segments, which are joined by splice plates into an integral structure. The access door segment has an umbilical door, as well as an equipment/personnel access door. The access door has the requirement to carry flight loads and still be removable at any time prior to flight. The IU has a diameter of 6.6 m (260 in), a height of 0.91 m (36 in), and a weight of around 2,000 kg (4,500 lb).

== Assembly ==
After the construction and ground testing of each stage was completed, they were each shipped to the Kennedy Space Center. The first two stages were so massive that the only way to transport them was by barge. Starting with the S-IC-3, the S-IC stages, constructed in New Orleans, were transported by barge, from the Michoud Assembly Facility to their testing facility and then to the Kennedy Space Center in Cape Canaveral, Florida. The S-II was constructed in Seal Beach, California and traveled to Kennedy Space Center on the USNS Point Barrow. The S-IVB was constructed in Huntington Beach, California and was transported by air on the Aero Spacelines Super Guppy, except for the S-IVB-501 stage, which was transported by sea. After rounding Florida, all the stages transported by boat were moved down the Intra-Coastal Waterway, across the Gulf of Mexico, to San Carlos Bay. From there, they traveled across Florida through the Okeechobee Waterway, before traveling up the coast to Cape Canaveral and the Vehicle Assembly Building.

Upon arrival at the Vehicle Assembly Building, each stage was inspected in a horizontal position before being oriented vertically starting with the first stage and ending with the Apollo spacecraft. NASA also constructed a large spool-shaped S-II second stage that could be used if a particular stage was delayed. These spools were identical to the real stage and contained the same electrical connections as the actual stages. NASA assembled the Saturn V on a mobile launcher by using a 230 metric tons (250 short tons) overhead bridge crane and slings to lift the first stage onto the mobile launcher. The first stage was then held in place by four support arms, and the rest of the stages stacked vertically in order. After assembly and testing were completed, the entire stack was moved from the Vehicle Assembly Building (VAB) to the launch pad using the Crawler Transporter (CT). Built by the Marion Power Shovel Company, the CT ran on four double-tracked treads, each with 57 "shoes". Each shoe weighed around 900 kg (2,000 lb). Each CT had a length of 40 m (130 ft) and a width of 35 m (115 ft). This transporter was also required to keep the rocket level within 10 minutes of arc (0.16 degrees), as it traveled the 5.535 km (3.439 mi) to the launch site, especially at the 5 percent grade encountered at the launch pad.

== Cost ==
From 1964 until 1973, $6.417 billion (equivalent to $35.5 billion in 2025) was appropriated for the Research and Development and flights of the Saturn V, with the maximum being in 1966 with $1.2 billion (equivalent to $9.08 billion in 2025). That same year, NASA received its largest total budget of $4.5 billion, about 0.5 percent of the gross domestic product (GDP) of the United States at that time. In the time frame from 1969 to 1971 the cost of launching a Saturn V Apollo mission was $185 million (equivalent to $1.02 billion in 2025).

== Mission profile ==
=== Launch preparation ===
The Mobile Service Structure (MSS), on which the Saturn V sat on, was moved to the launch pad at Launch Complex 39A around two months before launch. Moving the vehicle let technicians access parts normally inaccessible and allowed testing and other preparations to begin. Around 21 days before launch, technicians fueled the first stage up with RP-1. This was the only fuel that could be loaded this far from the launch date, as liquid oxygen and liquid hydrogen are cryogenic and could only be loaded a couple of hours before launch. The pre-count operations started around six days before launch; equipment was installed and additional testing was performed. At T−24 hours, the Saturn V was completely powered up using ground equipment and the Kennedy Space Center began monitoring wind speeds.

At T−9 hours before launch, an 11-hour hold would begin to allow work on any problems discovered. After, the backup crew of the mission entered the Command Module (CM) to set the switches and circuit breakers to a predetermined position. At T−7 hours 30 minutes, the liquid oxygen tanks on all three stages began to be loaded and would finish an hour later. At T−5 hours, the liquid hydrogen tanks began to be loaded, starting with the second stage and then the third stage. Both the liquid oxygen and liquid hydrogen tanks had to be continuously refilled as the previously loaded fuel boiled and evaporated. At T−3 hours 45 minutes, the crew was awakened and shortly after, another hold began. The hold lasted an hour and a half, allowing time to fix any remaining issues. At T−2 hours 40 minutes, the crew entered the Command Module and prepared for launch, with the hatch being closed 40 minutes later.

In the event of an abort, the range safety officer would remotely shut down the engines and send a command for the explosive charges attached to the rocket to detonate. These explosions would open the fuel and oxidizer tanks to help disperse the fuel and minimize mixing. Around T−40 minutes, a test was conducted to see if the Saturn V could pick up the signal, with the explosives being armed at T−5 minutes 30 seconds.

=== Startup sequence ===
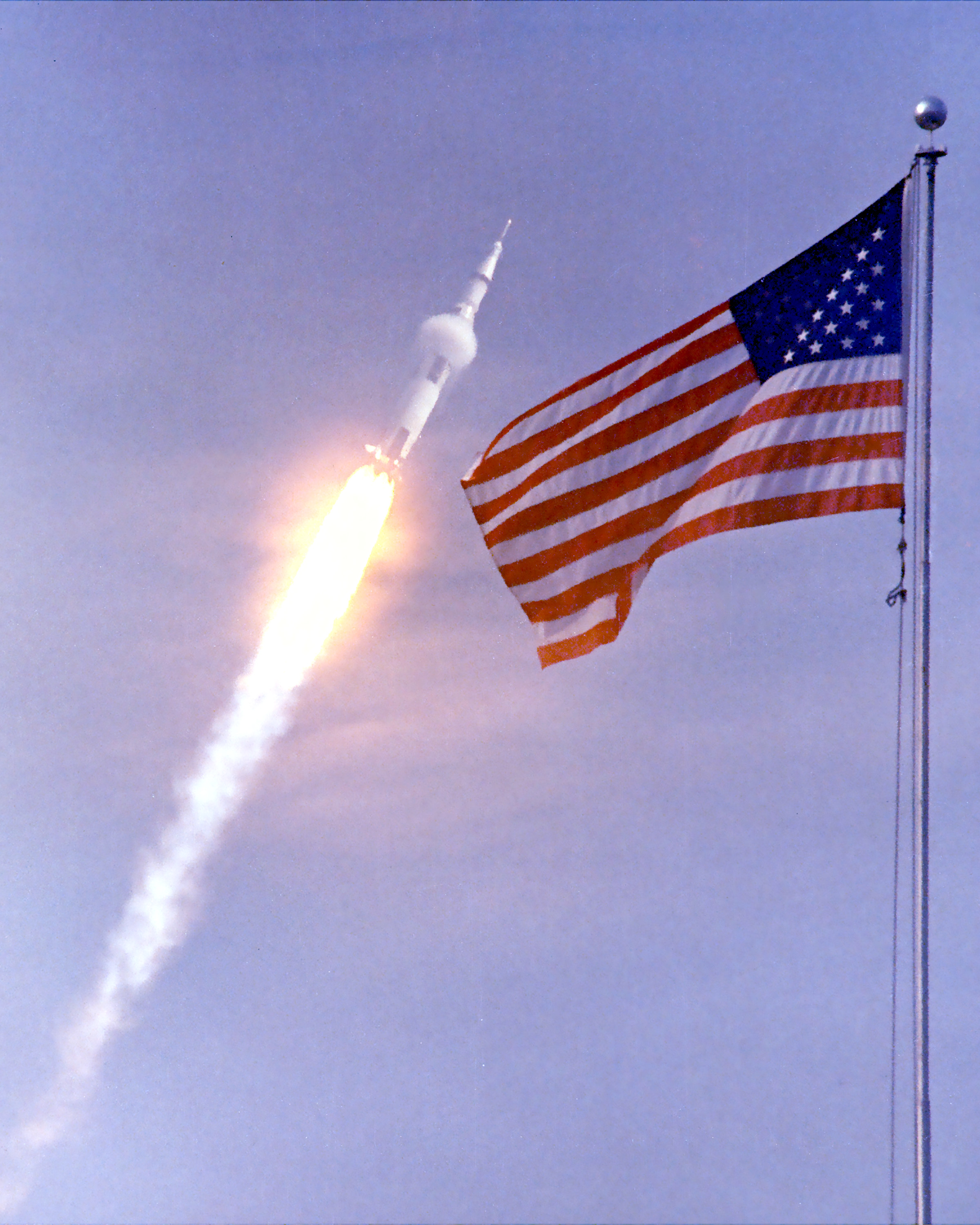
Condensation clouds surrounding the Apollo 11 Saturn V as it works its way through the dense lower atmosphere

At T−8 minutes, the onboard computer, the Launch Vehicle Digital Computer (LVDC), was armed. At T−5 minutes 45 seconds, the final Go/No-Go was given from the launch controllers. At T−4 minutes 30 seconds, the Terminal Countdown Sequencer (TCS) was armed and prepared to execute the countdown sequence automatically. At T−3 minutes 7 seconds, the TCS began the automatic countdown sequence. At T−16.97 seconds, the TCS sent a signal to the LVDC giving it access to the internal gyroscopes and accelerometers.

At T−8.9 seconds, the first-stage ignition sequence was initiated, with the center engine being ignited first, followed by opposing outboard pairs at 300-millisecond intervals to reduce the structural loads on the rocket. At T+0.3 seconds, the rocket was "soft released" in two stages. First, the hold-down arms released the rocket. Second, as the rocket began to accelerate upwards, it was slowed by tapered metal pins being pulled through holes for half a second. At T+0.63 seconds, the IU umbilical cable was disconnected, indicating to the LVDC that launch had occurred.

At about T+1.7 seconds, the vehicle yawed 1.25° away from the launch tower to ensure adequate clearance despite winds. It took about 10 seconds for the rocket to clear the tower; this varied between missions. At an altitude of 140 m (450 ft) the rocket rolled to the correct flight azimuth, which varied from 72 to 108 degrees depending on the time and date of launch. At T+20.6 seconds, the four outboard engines were tilted outward, in case of a premature outboard engine shutdown. At around T+1 minute, the Saturn V reached the speed of sound.

=== Max Q sequence ===
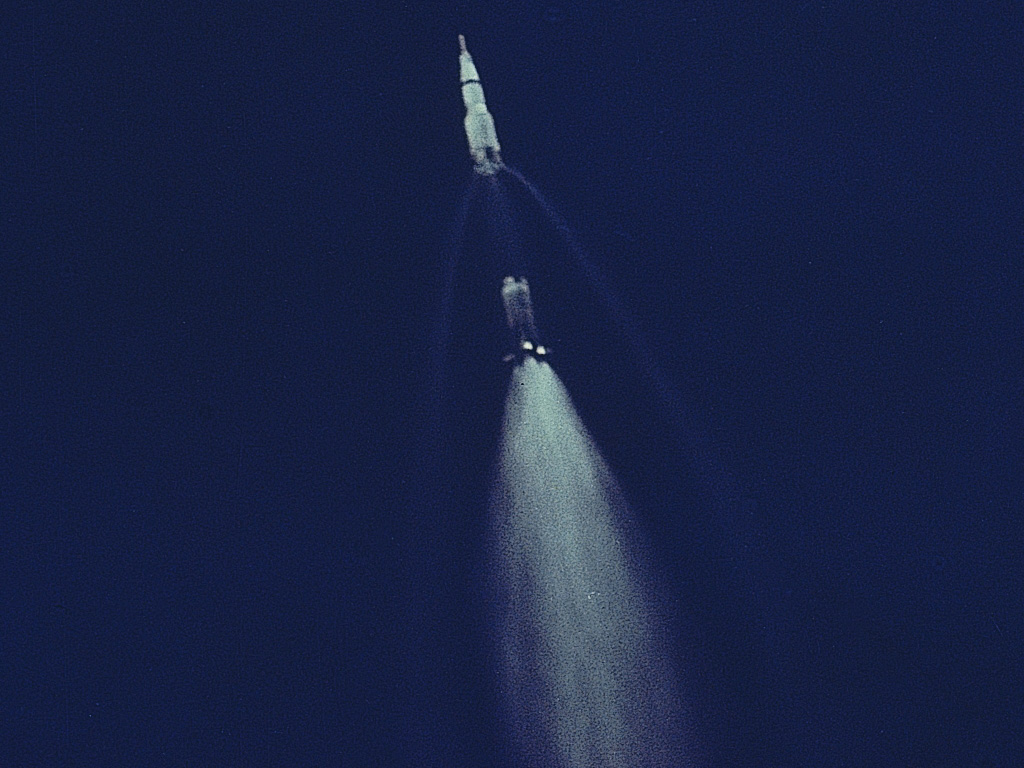
Apollo 11 S-IC separation

At about T+1 minute 6 seconds, the rocket experienced maximum dynamic pressure (max q). Dynamic pressure on a rocket varies with air density and relative velocity. Although velocity continues to increase, air density decreases so quickly with altitude that dynamic pressure falls below max q. As the Saturn V consumed fuel, its weight decreased, increasing its acceleration. This caused the crew to experience 4 g at T+2 minutes 15 seconds. To reduce the g forces, the center engine was cut, lowering the g forces to 3 g. Each F-1 engine consumed 900,000 kg/min (16.5 short ton/s). At this time, the Saturn V had an altitude of 44.1 km (23.8 nmi), weighted 1,110,000 kg (2,450,000 lb), and had a speed of 7,124.4 km/h; 4,426.9 mph (6,492.8 ft/s)

When the optical depletion sensors detected low fuel or oxidizer, the remaining four outboard engines were shut down. This would happen around T+2 minutes 40 seconds. The Saturn V had an altitude of 66.1 km (35.7 nmi), weighed 830,000 kg (1,820,000 lb), and had a speed of 9,950.8 km/h; 6,183.1 mph (9,068.6 ft/s) Just before first stage separation, on earlier Apollo missions, small ullage engines on the second stage were ignited for a few seconds to ensure the fuels were at the bottom of their tanks. First stage separation occurred less than one second after the engines were cut off. Eight small solid-fuel separation motors separated the S-IC from the rest of the vehicle. The first stage would continue on a ballistic trajectory for another minute and 45 seconds before falling into the Atlantic Ocean about 560 km (350 mi) downrange.

=== S-II sequence ===
Apollo 4 interstage falling away. The interstage glows as it interacts with the engine exhaust from the S-II.

After S-IC separation, the five J-2 engines were ignited and began providing thrust. It took a couple of seconds for the J-2 engines to reach full thrust. At about T+3 minutes 12 seconds, the interstage ring dropped from the second stage. The ring, sitting only a 1 m (3.3 ft) from the outboard J-2 engines, needed to fall cleanly without hitting them, as it could have potentially damaged the engines. Shortly after interstage separation, the Launch Escape System was also jettisoned.

At about T+3 minutes 24 seconds, the Saturn V switched from a pre-programmed trajectory to a "closed loop," or Iterative Guidance Mode. The pre-programmed trajectory was designed to keep the vehicle on its course but prioritized making sure that the aerodynamic forces on the Saturn V did not exceed its limits. The instrument unit computed in real time the most fuel-efficient trajectory toward its target orbit. If the instrument unit failed, the crew could switch control of the Saturn to the command module's computer, take manual control, or abort the flight. At about T+7 minutes 40 seconds, the center engine shut down to reduce longitudinal pogo oscillations.

Five level sensors in the bottom of each S-II propellant tank were armed during S-II flight, allowing any two to trigger S-II cutoff and staging when uncovered. At about T+9 minutes 8 seconds, the rest of the J-2 engines shut off and the process of separating the S-II from the S-IVB began. At this time, the Saturn V had an altitude of 187.2 km (101.1 nmi) and had a speed of 24,897.9 km/h; 15,470.9 mph (22,690.6 ft/s). Two small ullage engines were ignited and retro motors were fired, separating the S-II from the rest of the rocket.

=== S-IVB sequence ===
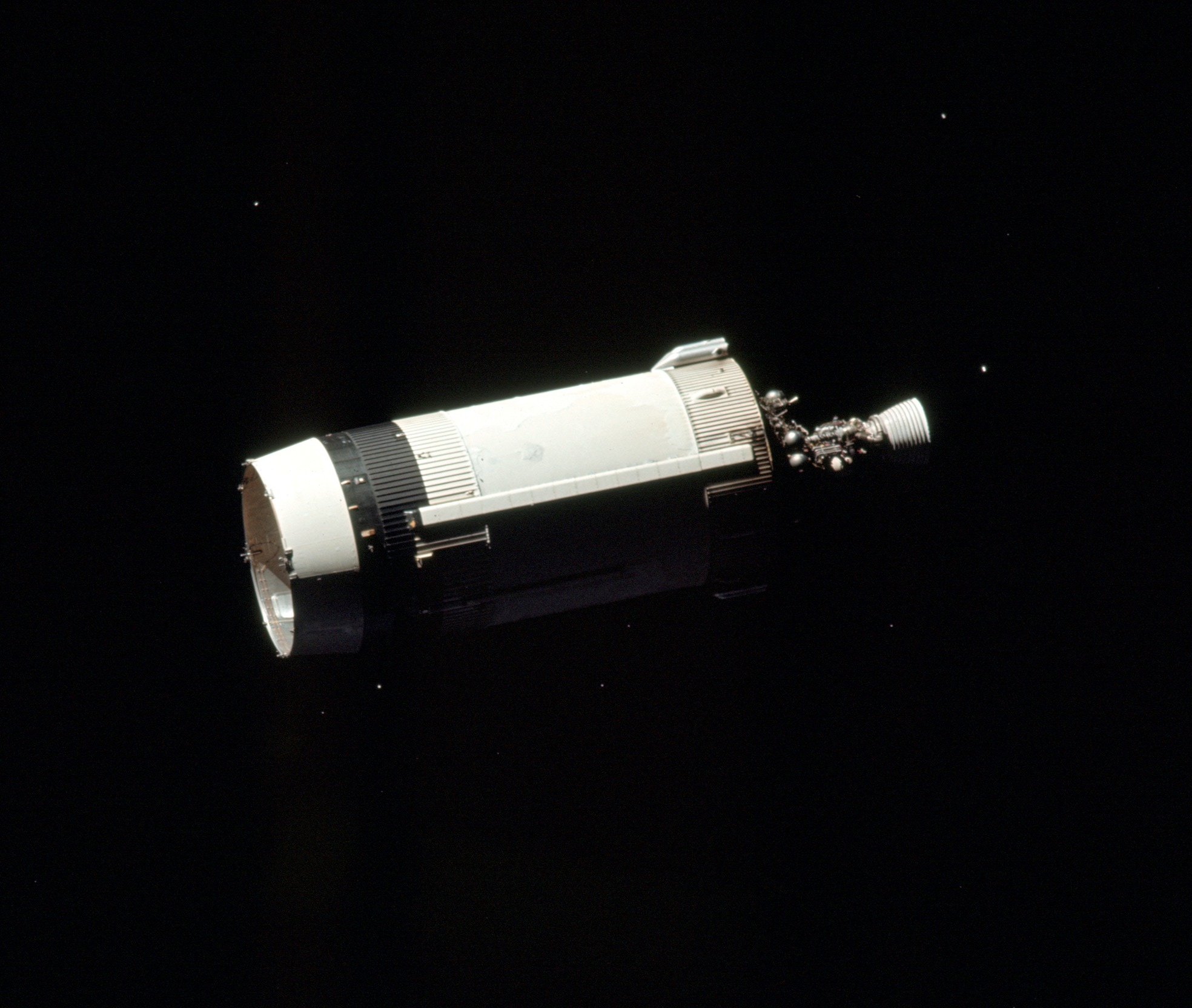
Apollo 17 S-IVB rocket stage, shortly after transposition and docking with the Lunar Module

Unlike the two-plane separation of the S-IC and S-II stages, the S-II and S-IVB separated with a single step. Less than one second after the S-II's engines were cut off, the S-IVB's single J-2 engine was ignited, taking about 5 seconds to reach full thrust.

The third stage burned for about 2.5 minutes until first cutoff at about T+11 minutes 40 seconds. The vehicle had an altitude of 191.1 km (103.2 nmi) and had a speed of 28,048 km/h; 17,428 mph (25,561 ft/s). Unlike the previous two stages, S-IVB's J-2 engine was restarted for trans-lunar injection (TLI). After engine cutoff, the Saturn V entered an Earth parking orbit 190 km (100 nmi) above the Earth. The third stage remained attached to the spacecraft while it orbited the Earth one and a half times.

=== Lunar Module sequence ===
TLI came at about T+2 hours 44 minutes after launch. The J-2 took around 10 seconds to reach full thrust. The S-IVB burned for almost six minutes, giving the spacecraft a velocity of about 39,027.6 km/h; 24,250.6 mph (35,567.6 ft/s). About 40 minutes after TLI, the Apollo Command and Service module (CSM) separated from the third stage, turned 180 degrees, and docked with the Lunar Module (LM), which rode below the CSM during launch. The CSM and LM separated from the spent third stage 50 minutes later in a maneuver known as transposition, docking, and extraction.

If it remained on the same trajectory as the spacecraft, the S-IVB could have presented a collision hazard, so its remaining propellants were vented, and the auxiliary propulsion system was fired to move it away. For lunar missions before Apollo 13, the S-IVB was directed toward the Moon's trailing edge in its orbit, slingshotting it beyond Earth escape velocity and into solar orbit. From Apollo 13 onwards, the S-IVB was sent to hit the Moon. Seismometers left behind by previous missions detected the impacts, and the information helped map the internal structure of the Moon.

=== Skylab sequence ===
In 1965, the Apollo Applications Program (AAP) was created to explore scientific missions that could be performed using Apollo hardware. Much of the planning centered on the idea of a space station. Von Braun's earlier 1964 plans employed a "wet workshop" concept, with a spent S-II Saturn V second stage being launched into orbit and outfitted in space. The following year, AAP studied a smaller station using the Saturn IB second stage. By 1969, Apollo funding cuts eliminated the possibility of procuring more Apollo hardware and forced the cancellation of some later Moon landing flights. This freed up at least one Saturn V, allowing the wet workshop to be replaced with the "dry workshop" concept: the station—now known as Skylab— would be built on the ground from a surplus Saturn IB second stage and launched atop the first two live stages of a Saturn V. A backup station, constructed from a Saturn V third stage, was built and is now on display at the National Air and Space Museum. The only significant changes to the Saturn V from the Apollo configurations involved some modifications to the S-II to act as the terminal stage for inserting the Skylab payload into Earth orbit. The S-II remained in orbit for almost two years before it made an uncontrolled re-entry on January 11, 1975.

== LES System ==
Use:

- Used when thrust from 2 or more engines from the SI-C are lost
- or when the flight angle (pitch, yaw, roll) go beyond set parameters
  - Meaning the flight goes off set course
  - Pitch - When the nose tilts direction, tilts its nose to stear path through space. The front of the rocket moves, so that the rest of it follows in that direction
    - Up, down
    - Shaking head yes
  - Yaw - Yaw is when the nose of the rocket tilts left or right, like shaking head no.
  - Roll - When a rocket spins, it spins in a circle, keeping the rocket moving straight.
    - Like how a spiraling football goes more straight
    - Keeps the other components in check
- Can be done manually uo until LES is jettisoned
  - Jettisoned means a part has been thrown away on purpose
    - The purpose is to make the rocket lighter
    - When a tank is empty, it is just extraneous weight, so it is thrown away
    - The LES is jettisoned about 30 secs after second stage
    - If no abort occurred, the LES was discarded once the vehicle reached high altitude
      - around 295,000 feet on the Saturn V—so the spacecraft would not carry unneeded weight or drag for the rest of the mission. [1, 2]
- When an emergency is detected within 100 seconds of takeoff it happens automatically

How it works:

- Explosive connections released the Command Module from the launch vehicle while the escape motors fired to lift the capsule high and clear of a failing booster or pad explosion
- Pitch control helped steer the capsule laterally away from the hazard so the Command Module's parachute recovery system could deploy for a safe ocean splashdown

== Post-Apollo proposal ==
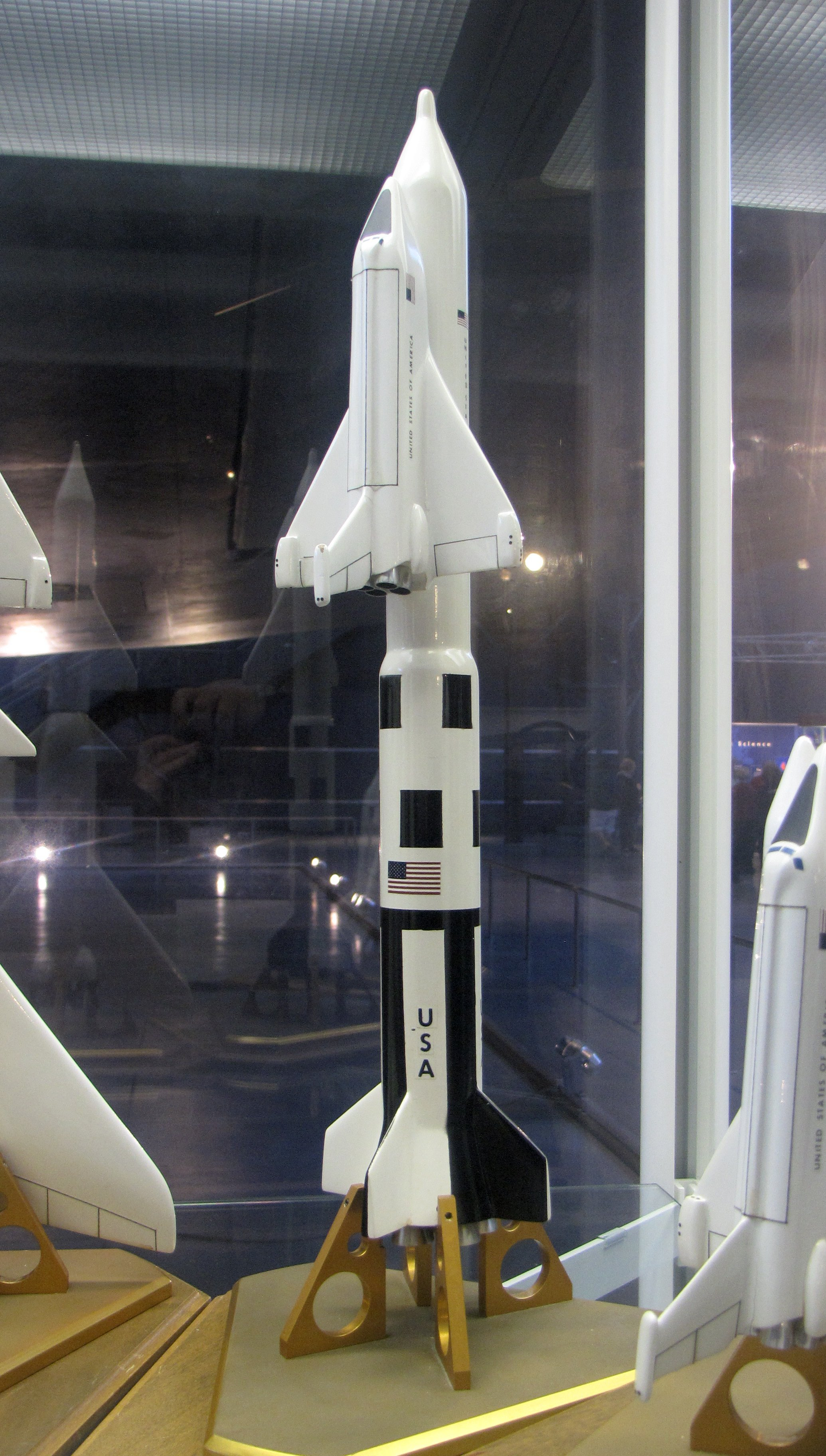
The Saturn-Shuttle concept

In the early 1970s, as the public's attention turned away from space exploration to other matters, such as the Vietnam War, Congress began to cut NASA's budget. The U.S. Government was less willing to continue funding NASA, especially after the improvement of U.S.-Soviet relations. The Apollo Applications Program explored other Saturn V mission profiles. NASA considered three-man Venus flyby; the S-IVB stage would have been a "wet workshop" similar to the original design of Skylab. After Apollo, the Saturn V was planned to be the prime launch vehicle for Prospector. Prospector was a proposed 330 kg (730 lb) robotic rover, similar to the two Soviet Lunokhod rovers, the Voyager Mars probes, and a scaled-up version of the Voyager interplanetary probes. The Saturn V was also to have been the launch vehicle for the nuclear rocket stage RIFT test program and for some versions of the upcoming NERVA project.

All of these planned uses of the Saturn V were canceled, with cost being a major factor. Edgar Cortright, who had been the director of NASA Langley, stated decades later that "JPL never liked the big approach. They always argued against it. I probably was the leading proponent in using the Saturn V, and I lost. Probably very wise that I lost."

The canceled second production run of Saturn Vs would very likely have featured an uprated F-1 engine in its first stage, providing a substantial performance boost. Other likely changes would have been bigger fins, a strengthened construction, a stretched S-IC first stage, and the HG-3 engine for the upper stages.

A number of alternate Saturn vehicles were proposed based on the Saturn V, ranging from the Saturn INT-20 with an S-IVB stage and interstage mounted directly onto a S-IC, through to the Saturn V-24(L), which would not only have five uprated F-1 engines in the first stage, but also four strap-on boosters with two uprated F-1 engines each, giving a total of thirteen F-1 engines firing at launch.

Lack of a second Saturn V production run killed these plans, and left the United States without a super heavy-lift launch vehicle. Some in the U.S. space community came to lament this situation. The Saturn-Shuttle could also have eliminated the Space Shuttle Solid Rocket Boosters that ultimately precipitated the Challenger accident in 1986.

== Saturn V displays ==
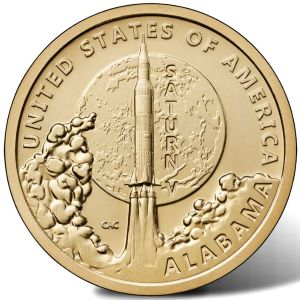
The Saturn V depicted on the reverse of the 2024 Alabama American Innovation dollar

- There is one Saturn V on display at the U.S. Space & Rocket Center in Huntsville. SA-500D is on horizontal display made up of its S-IC-D, S-II-F/D and S-IVB-D. These were all test stages not meant for flight. This vehicle was displayed outdoors from 1969 to 2007, was restored, and is now displayed in the Davidson Center for Space Exploration.
- There is one at the Johnson Space Center made up of the first stage from SA-514, the second stage from SA-515, and the third stage from SA-513 (replaced for flight by the Skylab workshop). With stages arriving between 1977 and 1979, this was displayed in the open until its 2005 restoration when a structure was built around it for protection. This is the only display Saturn consisting entirely of stages intended to be launched.
- One at the Kennedy Space Center Visitor Complex, made up of S-IC-T (test stage) and the second and third stages from SA-514. It was displayed outdoors for decades, then in 1996 was enclosed for protection from the elements in the Apollo/Saturn V Center.
- The S-IC stage from SA-515, originally at the Michoud Assembly Facility, New Orleans, is now on display at the Infinity Science Center in Mississippi.
- The S-IVB stage from SA-515 was converted for use as a backup for Skylab, and is on display at the National Air and Space Museum in Washington, D.C.
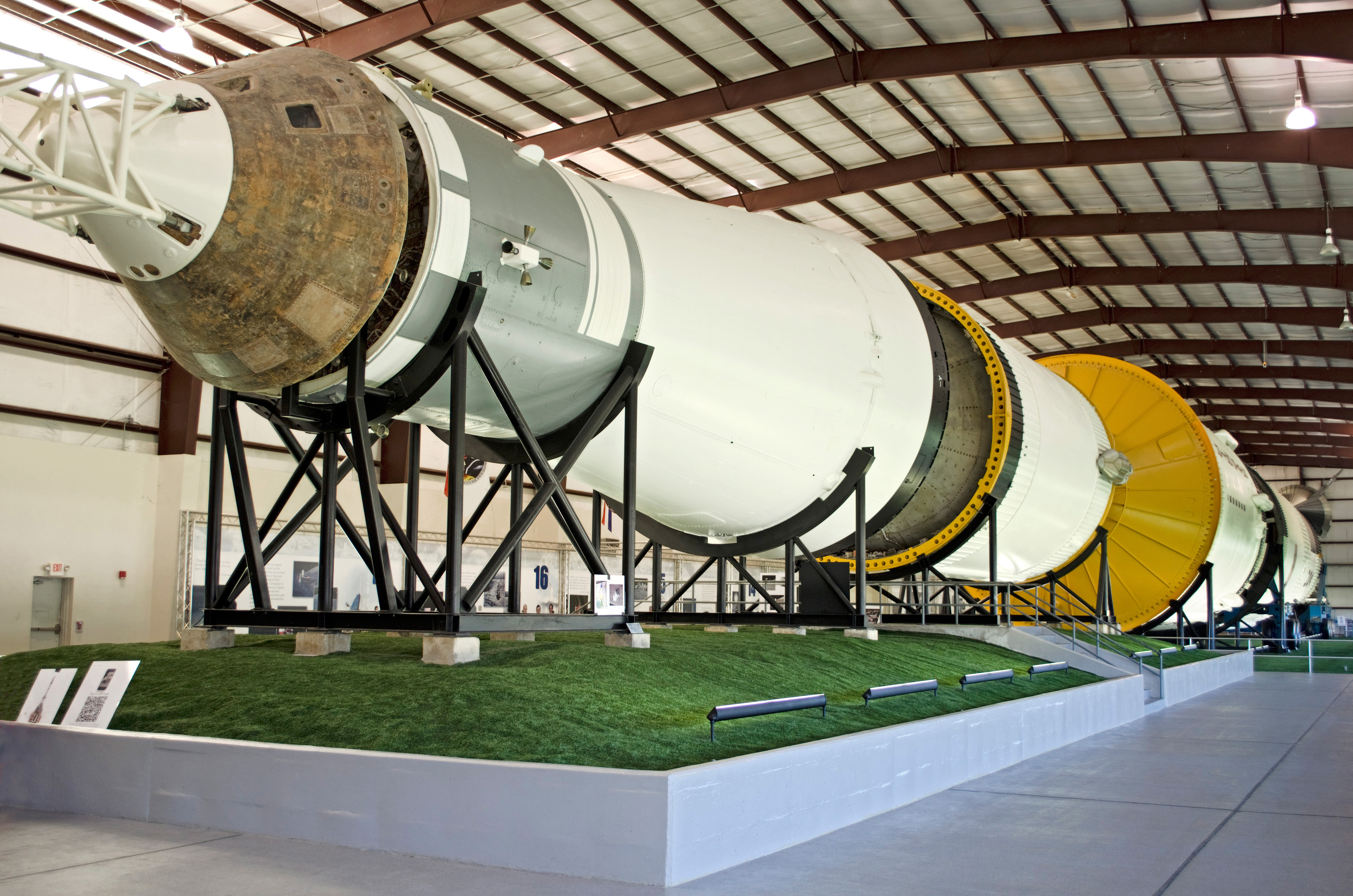
First stage from SA-514, second stage from SA-515, and third stage from SA-513, Johnson Space Center

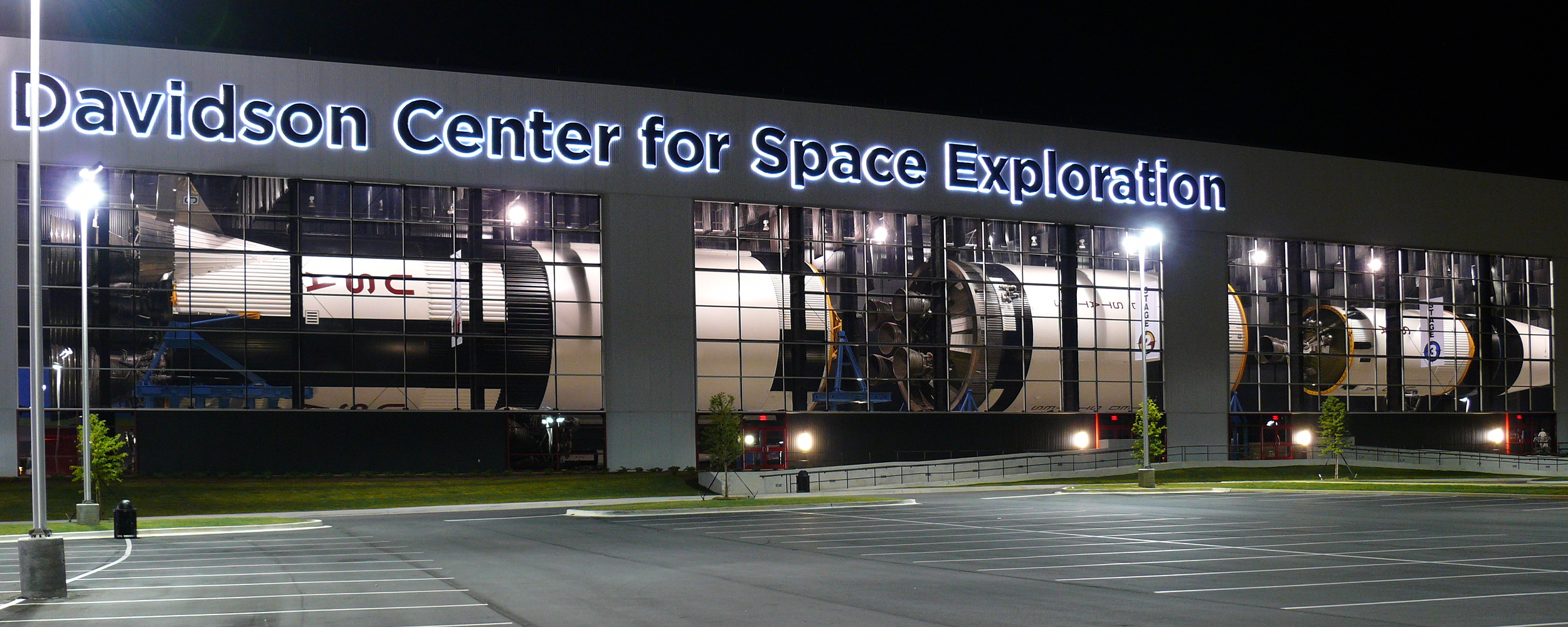
SA-500D (S-IC-D, S-II-F/D and S-IVB-D), U.S. Space & Rocket Center, Huntsville

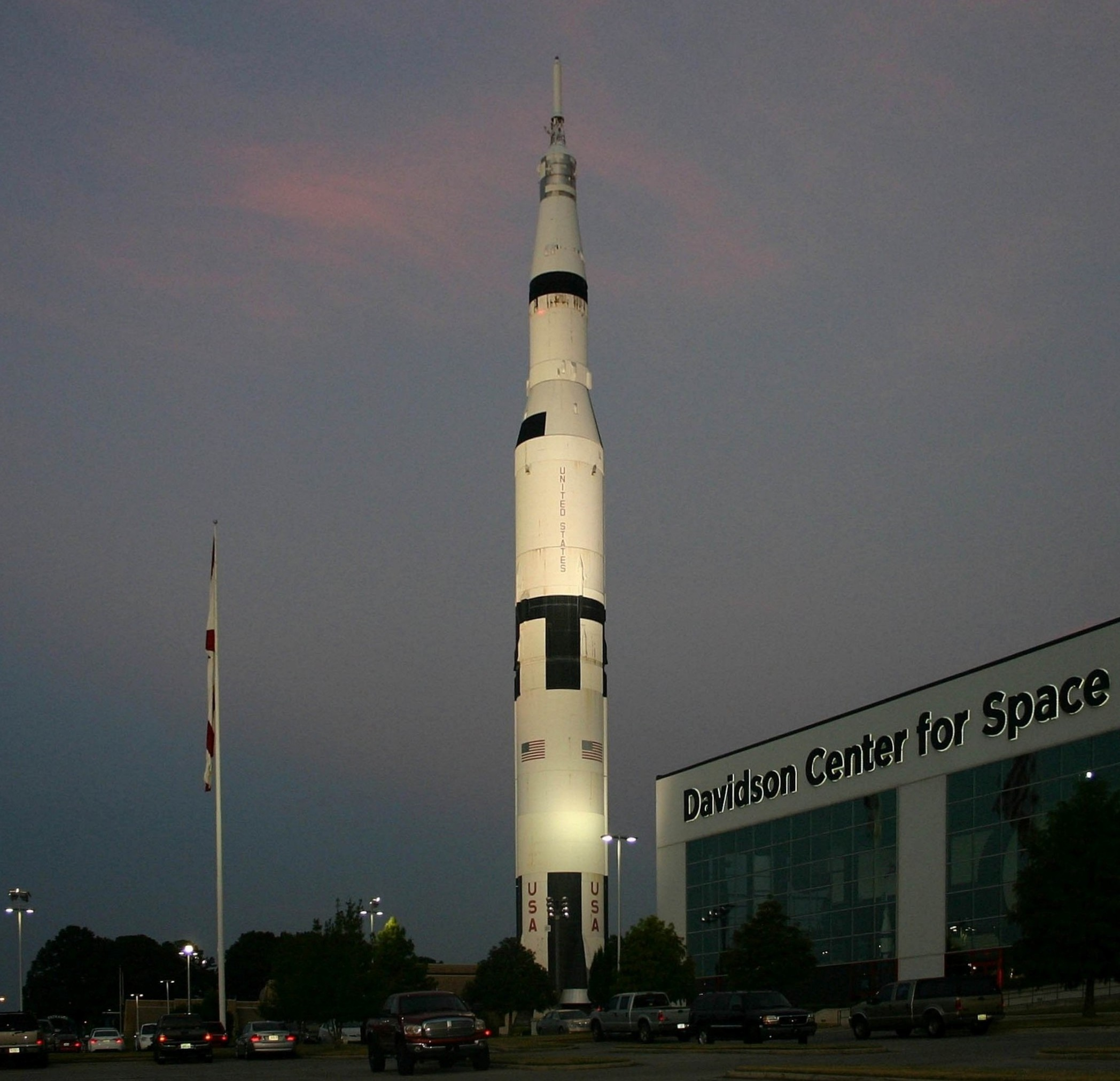
Saturn V mock up, 1ː1 scale, U.S. Space & Rocket Center, Huntsville

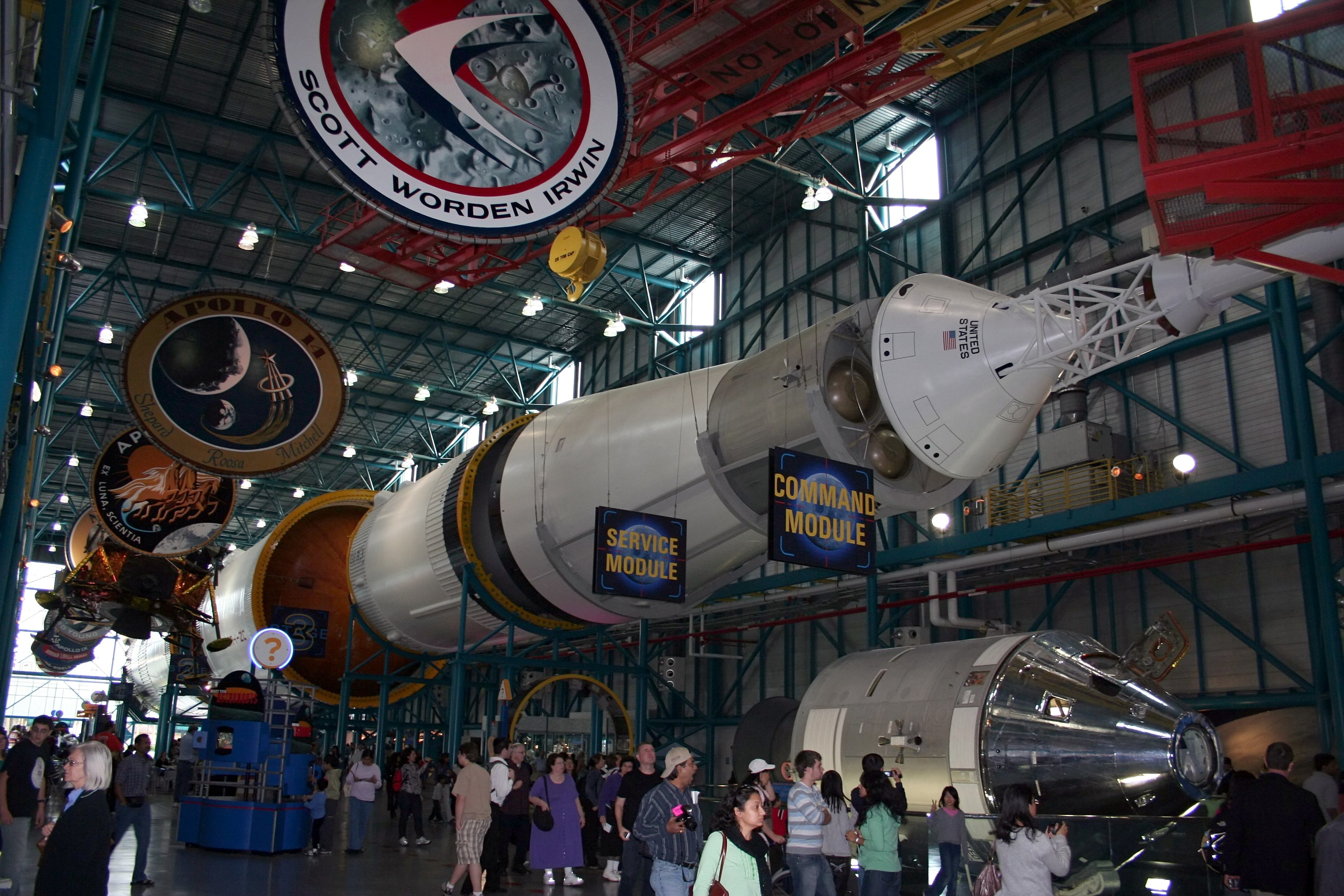
S-IC-T (test stage) and second and third stages from SA-514, Kennedy Space Center Visitor Complex

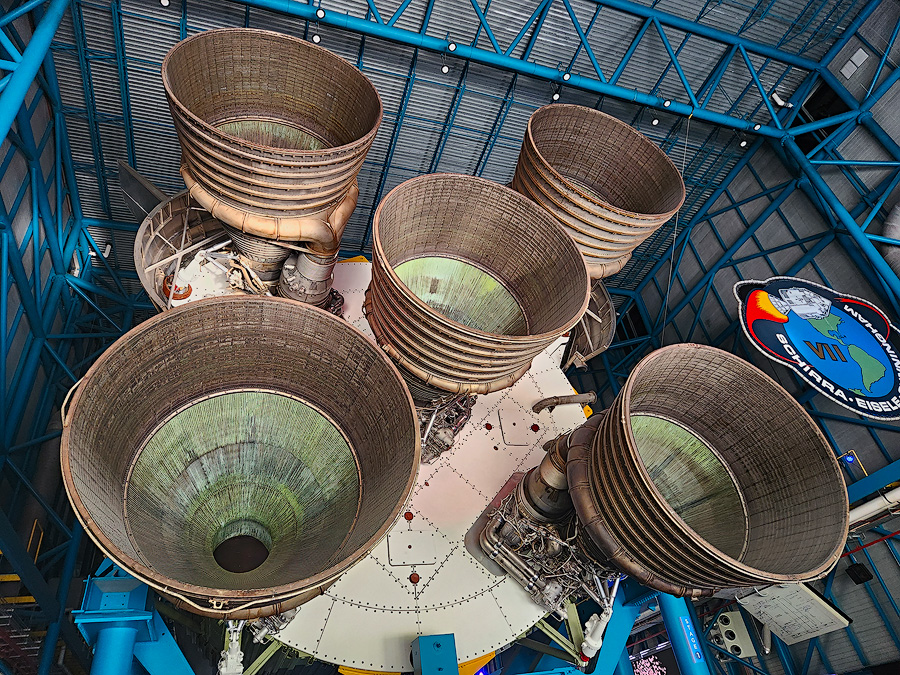
Saturn V main rockets, Kennedy Space Center Visitor Complex

== Discarded stages ==
On September 3, 2002, astronomer Bill Yeung discovered a suspected asteroid, which was given the discovery designation J002E3. It appeared to be in orbit around the Earth, and was soon discovered from spectral analysis to be covered in white titanium dioxide, which was a major constituent of the paint used on the Saturn V. Calculation of orbital parameters led to tentative identification as being the Apollo 12 S-IVB stage. Mission controllers had planned to send Apollo 12's S-IVB into solar orbit after separation from the Apollo spacecraft, but it is believed the engine burn lasted too long, and hence did not send it close enough to the Moon, so it remained in a barely stable orbit around the Earth and Moon. In 1971, through a series of gravitational perturbations, it is believed to have entered in a solar orbit and then returned into weakly captured Earth orbit 31 years later. It left Earth orbit again in June 2003.

== See also ==
- Comparison of orbital launchers families
- Comparison of orbital launch systems
- Space exploration
- Comet HLLV (a Saturn-derived launch vehicle design from the 1990s)
