= Combustion engine =

A combustion engine is an engine which generates mechanical power by combustion of a fuel. Combustion engines are of two general types:

- Internal combustion engine
- External combustion engine
