= Propane refrigeration =

Industrial process

Propane refrigeration is a type of compression refrigeration. Propane (R-290) has been used successfully in industrial refrigeration for many years, and is emerging as an increasingly viable alternative for homes and businesses. Propane's operating pressures and temperatures are well suited for use in air conditioning equipment, but because of propane’s flammability, great care is required in the manufacture, installation and servicing of equipment that uses it as a refrigerant.

Propane that is supplied for general use – such as in barbeques and patio heaters – is not suitable for use in refrigeration systems because it can contain high levels of contaminants, including moisture and unsaturated hydrocarbons. Only propane produced specifically for use in refrigeration systems – with a purity of at least 98.5% and moisture content below 10ppm (by weight) – should be used.

With a global warming potential (GWP) of 0.072 and an ozone depletion potential (ODP) of 0, R-290 is of very little threat to the environment. The Environmental Protection Agency (EPA) has listed R-290 as an acceptable refrigerant substitute under its Significant New Alternatives Policy (SNAP), and recently exempted it from the venting prohibition in Section 608 of the Clean Air Act.
