= Propellant tank =

Type of container in a vehicle

A propellant tank is a container which is part of a vehicle, where propellant is stored prior to use. Propellant tanks vary in construction, and may be a fuel tank in the case of many aircraft.

In rocket vehicles, propellant tanks are fairly sophisticated since weight is on a premium.

== Rocket propellant tanks ==
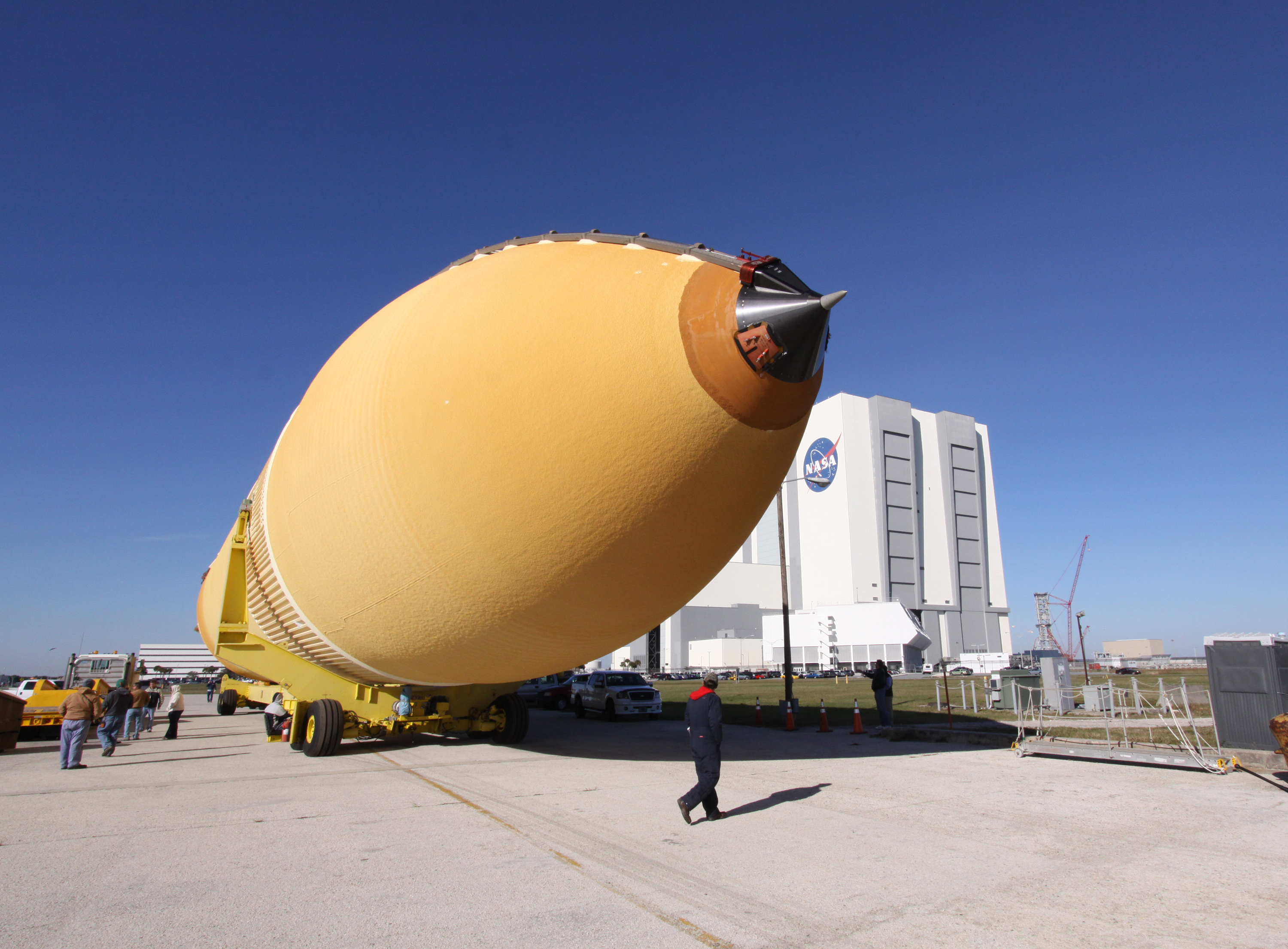
External liquid hydrogen tank of a Space Shuttle

Rocket propellant tanks are pressure vessels where liquid fuels are stored prior to use. They have to store the propellant while minimizing slosh and particularly when the tank is nearly empty, minimizing vortexing.

Rocket propellant tanks are often constructed of materials such as aluminium alloys, steels, carbon fibre wound tanks and other heat resistant, strong metals.

These kinds of tanks are usually constructed using monocoque construction techniques. Balloon tanks are the most extreme of these, they are held rigid only by internal pressurization, but are extremely lightweight. Rocket propellant tanks are of many shapes but the optimum shape of a tank is spherical, because for given volume it results in a tank with least weight. Normally, propellant in the tank is stored at a pressure of about 1-4 bar, if the system uses turbopump to deliver high pressure to the combustion chamber. This method reduces the wall thickness and hence the weight of the tank. If the propellant in the tank is stored at very high pressure, then the wall thickness of the tank is increased and hence the weight of the tank.
