= SA-500 =

SA-500 may refer to:

- Stolp SA-500 Starlet, American amateur-built aircraft
- SA-500D, prototype NASA Saturn V rocket used for dynamic testing
- SA-500F, prototype NASA Saturn V rocket used for facilities integration
