= FVV =

FVV may refer to:

== Groups and organizations ==
- FVV (German: Forschungsvereinigung Verbrennungskraftmaschinen e.V.; English: Research Association for Combustion Engines eV)
- FVV (Budapest), trambus operator, predecessor to Budapesti Közlekedési Zrt.
- Frankfurter Verkehrsverbund, predecessor to Frankfurt U-Bahn

== Vehicles ==
- FVV (armoured car fighting vehicle), see List of armored fighting vehicles of the Soviet Union
- Facilities Verification Vehicle
  - an Apollo module used in the Saturn IB display
  - a Saturn V rocket used for SA-500F
- FV-V, a series of tractors from Farmall France

== Other uses ==
- Fred VanVleet (born 1994), U.S. basketball player

== See also ==
- FV (disambiguation)
- FW (disambiguation)
- FV2 (disambiguation)
