= FW =

FW may stand for:

== Arts and entertainment ==
- Fates Warning, an American progressive metal band
- Frei.Wild, a German-language rock band from Brixen, Italy
- Fair Warning (Van Halen album), an album by hard rock band, Van Halen
- Fairy Wars, the 12.8th game in the Touhou Project series
- Fish Wrangler, a Facebook game
- Fossilized Wonders, the 20th game in the Touhou Project series

== Businesses ==
- FatWire, a vendor of content management system
- Focke-Wulf, a German aircraft manufacturer
- F+W, a media and e-commerce company

== In computing ==
- FatWire, a vendor of content management system
- Firewall (computing), a security device in computer networks
- FireWire, a high speed serial interface standard
- Adobe Fireworks, a graphics editing program
- Firmware, software that is embedded in a hardware device
- Email forwarding, in email subject lines ("Fwd" is sometimes used as well)
- FrostWire, a P2P client

== Places ==
- Fort Worth, Texas
- Fort Wayne, Indiana
- Federal Way, Washington

== Sport ==
- Faceoffs Won, in ice hockey
- Flash Wolves, a Taiwanese esports team
- Forward (association football), a position in association football (soccer)

== In people ==
- F. W. Chapman (1806-1876), American Congregational minister, educator, and genealogist
- F. W. de Klerk (1936–2021), President of South Africa

== Other uses ==
- Fashion week, an annual event in the fashion industry
- Feldwebel, a German military rank
- Fighter aircraft wing, in the United States Air Force
- Fireworks
- First wall, in nuclear fusion
- Formula Weight, the molecular weight of an organic chemical in daltons
- Free Voters, a German association of persons participating in an election without being a registered political party
- Ibex Airlines IATA Airlines Code

== See also ==
- WF (disambiguation)
- F (disambiguation)
- W (disambiguation)
- FVV (disambiguation)
