= FV2 =

FV2 or variation, may refer to:

- Bateleur FV2, a South African mobile multiple rocket launcher truck
- Toyota FV2, a 2014 concept car
- FV2, a car from Facel, a version of the Facel Vega FVS

== See also ==
- FV (disambiguation)
- FW (disambiguation)
- FVV (disambiguation)
