= Saturn V Dynamic Test Stand =

- U.S. National Register of Historic Places
- U.S. National Historic Landmark
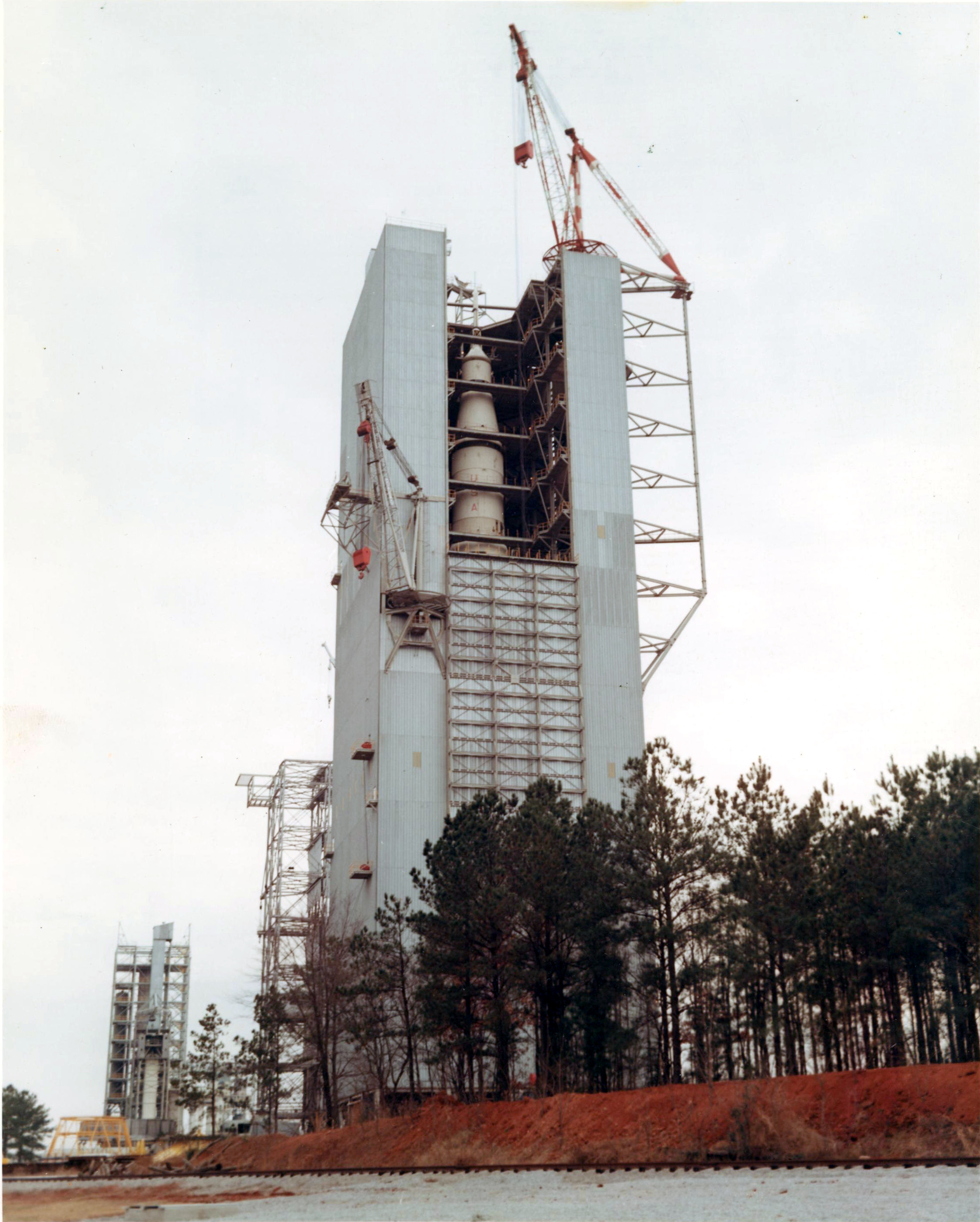
- SA-500D is erected inside the dynamic test stand for configuration I testing, December, 1966.

- Location within Huntsville, Alabama Location within Alabama Location within the United States
- Location: Huntsville, Alabama
- Coordinates: 34°37′50.97″N 86°39′40.13″W
- Area: less than one acre
- Built: 1964
- Architect: Heinz Hilten of NASA
- Demolished: January 10, 2026
- NRHP reference No.: 85002806

Significant dates
- Added to NRHP: October 3, 1985
- Designated NHL: October 3, 1985

Saturn V Dynamic Test Stand, also known as dynamic structural test facility, at the George C. Marshall Space Flight Center in Huntsville, Alabama was the test stand used for testing of the Saturn V rocket and the Space Shuttle prior to the vehicles' first flights. Designated building 4550, it stood 363 feet (111 m) tall and is 98 feet (30 m) square. Its central bay had maximum dimensions of 74 by 74 feet (23 m × 23 m), and it was topped by a derrick capable of moving 200-ton objects in a 70-foot (21 m) radius. An elevator provided access to 15 levels in the structure, and a cable tunnel connected the building to control facilities in the space center's East Test Area.

NASA built the test stand in 1964 to conduct mechanical and vibrational tests on the fully assembled Saturn V rocket. Major problems capable of causing failure of the vehicle were discovered and corrected here. The new building was so tall that in 1966 when the Saturn V first stage was entering, an observer noted, "Fog and clouds hovered around the top of the 360-foot (110 m) tall test stand most of the day while the 300,000-pound (140,000 kg) stage was being lifted from its transporter into place inside the stand, said to be the tallest building in Alabama." The stand was used to test how spacecraft behaved when put under vibrating and bending stresses, and to test the connections between major stages of the craft.

It was declared a National Historic Landmark in 1985 for its role in the Saturn V program.

In addition to the Saturn V Dynamic Test Vehicle, designated SA-500D, two Space Shuttle test vehicles, Pathfinder and Enterprise, were also tested in this facility.

The Drop Tube Facility was located in the MSFC Dynamic Test Stand. It consisted of sections of 10-inch (26 cm) diameter stainless steel pipe vertically assembled into a tube 344 feet (105 m) in length. Samples with diameters up to 0.31 inches (8 mm) can be melted at the top and dropped free-fall for 4.6 seconds. The stand was later intended to be used to test the Ares I rocket in various configurations for the Constellation program but the program was cancelled before any conversion work could be done.

Demolition was performed on January 10, 2026.

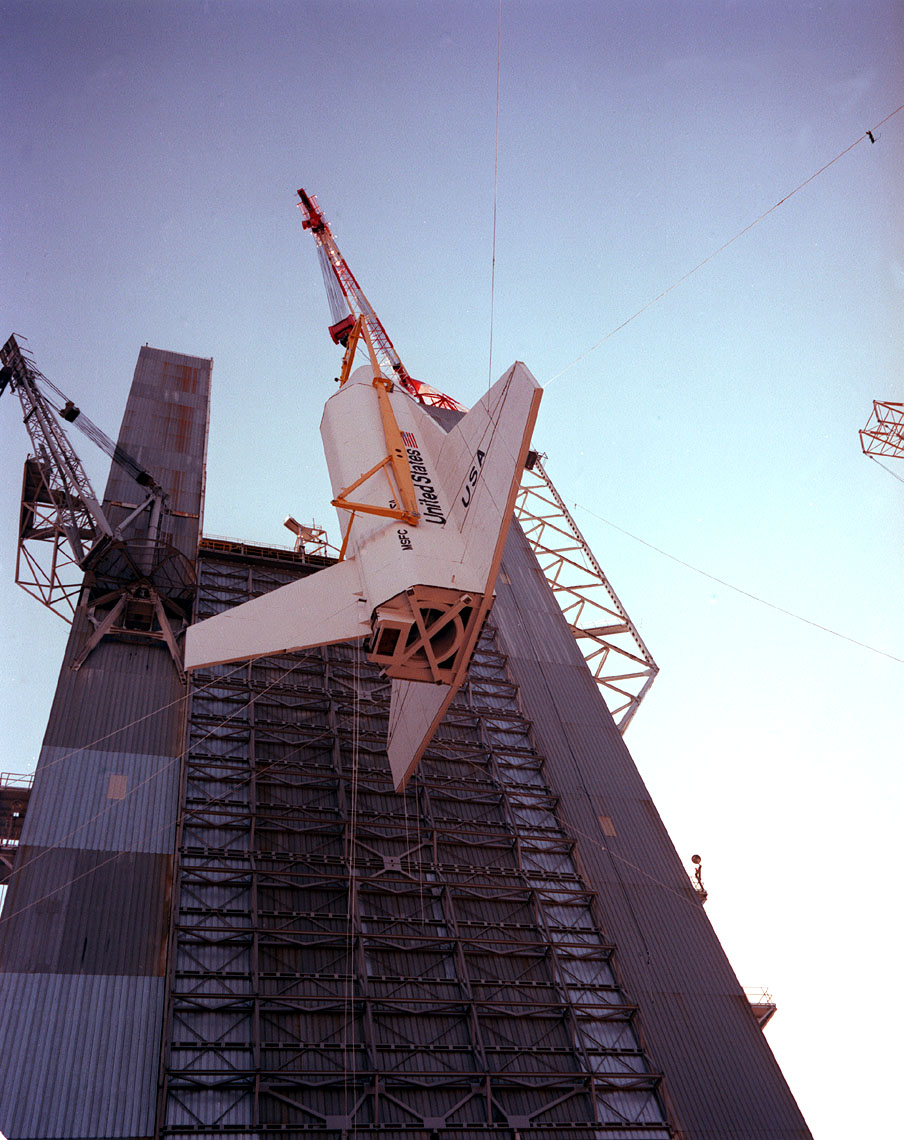
The Space Shuttle Orbiter simulator is hoisted into the Saturn V dynamic test stand in 1977

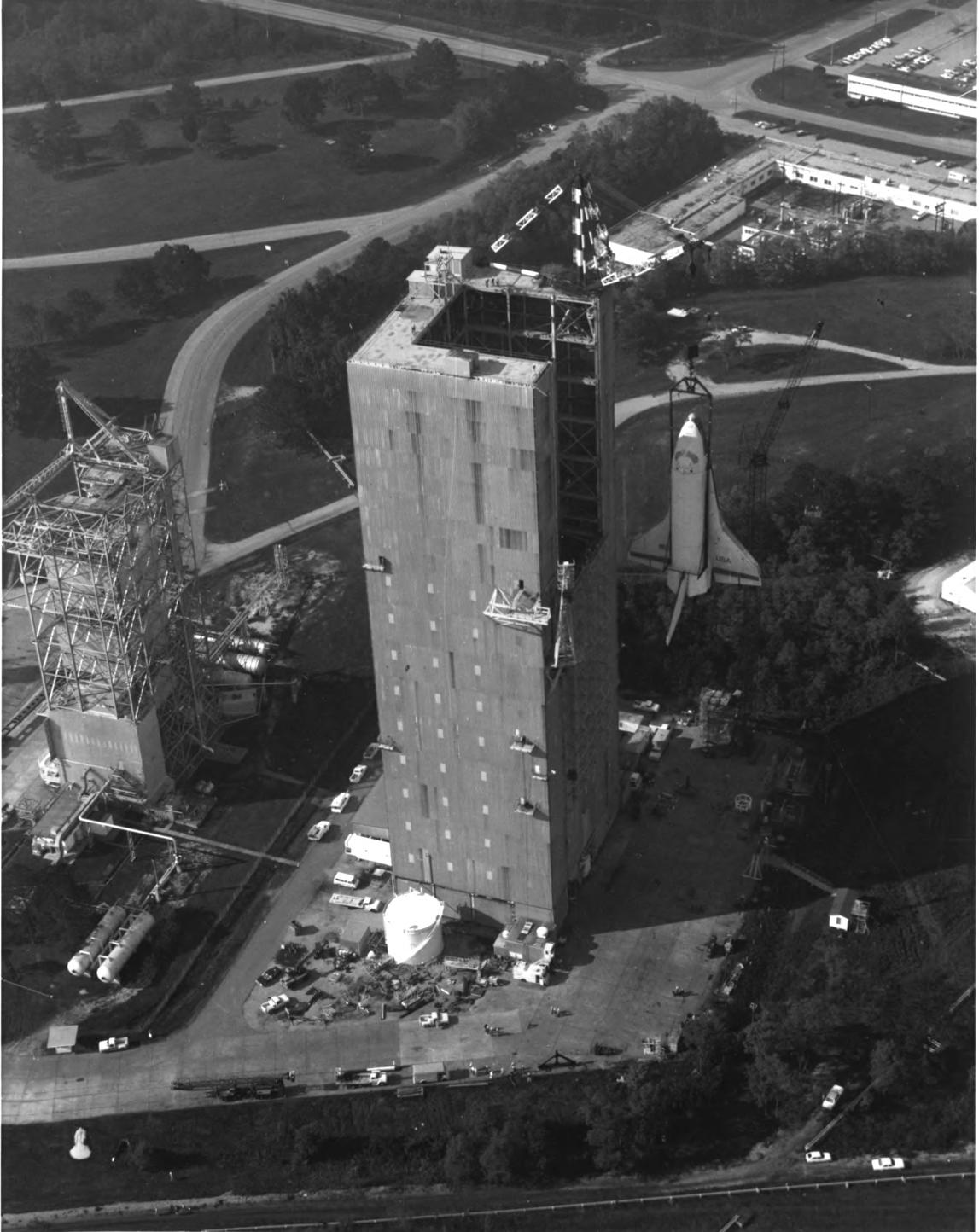
The Shuttle Enterprise is loaded into the Saturn V dynamic test stand for a shake test, c. 1978

== See also ==
- List of National Historic Landmarks in Alabama
