= Fish Wrangler =

2008 video game

- Developer: Joe Faron
- Type: Idle, strategy, multiplayer
- Launched: 14 July 2008
- Platforms: Web browser; Android
- Website: fishwrangler.com

Fish Wrangler is a passive fishing browser game played on Facebook or can be played on its stand-alone FishWrangler.com website. Players can cast every 15 minutes to catch various fish from the fictional locations of Farovia, Icelantica, and Roperia. The game was created by Joe Faron.

== Gameplay ==
The goal of the game is to catch all the different types of fish in Farovia, Icelantica, and other lands. Players start in Waterport, an island in Farovia, with a basic pole - either the Oak Branch pole or the Broken Standard pole - and can catch the various fish found around the island. Eventually, players may travel to different islands by boat in order to catch different fish and complete quests.

A player may cast once every 15 minutes, with the chance of catching a fish. Each fish caught will gain the player points and gold (or other types of currency depending on the region), which can be used to purchase other items such as different poles, skills, resources, and boats. Stronger poles cost more gold to purchase and have increased strength and lure ratings, allowing the player to catch rarer and more valuable fish. Skills must be purchased in the early stages of the game in order to progress and will increase your skill points. Resources can be found throughout the Fish Wrangler world both in stores and while fishing, and have a variety of effects: some resources attract or repel specific species of fish, others reduce the waiting time between casts, and still others are required to progress in the game. Boats are needed to travel to different islands and can advance in level to travel faster between islands.

Although a player can only cast every 15 minutes (excluding the use of resources), additional casts may occur when a member of the player's crew (a Facebook friend who has been invited to join the player in the game) can take the player fishing with them. In addition to crew trips, players who invite others to use the application will become a captain for the invited player. Both the captain and the apprentice will receive one captain trip (a trip in which the apprentice receives some of the rewards for the captain's catch) a day, provided the captain has been seen recently. Players who fish at least once on any given day will also receive automated "deckhand checks" for the remainder of that day.

Players may also complete quests, which involve catching a certain quota of fish with a specified pole. Quests offer rewards in the form of augments, which allow the player to level their pole thirty levels past the usual maximum. Advanced quests may also reward players with "liquid gold", a resource used to attract particularly rare fish.

== Reception ==
Lucy A. Snyder, a five-time Bram Stoker Award-winning author, offered high praise for Fish Wrangler. Snyder commended the game for its "engaging gameplay and creative setting," describing it as a "must-play for enthusiasts of the genre."

In December 2009, Fish Wrangler was voted the Best Facebook Game and Best Facebook Application in the third annual Open Web Awards run by Mashable.

The game was given a positive review in Gamezebo, praising the game as "easy and hassle free to play", and noting the game's multitude of social features.
