= Saturn V Dynamic Test Vehicle =

Moon rocket test article in Huntsville, Alabama

- U.S. National Register of Historic Places
- U.S. National Historic Landmark
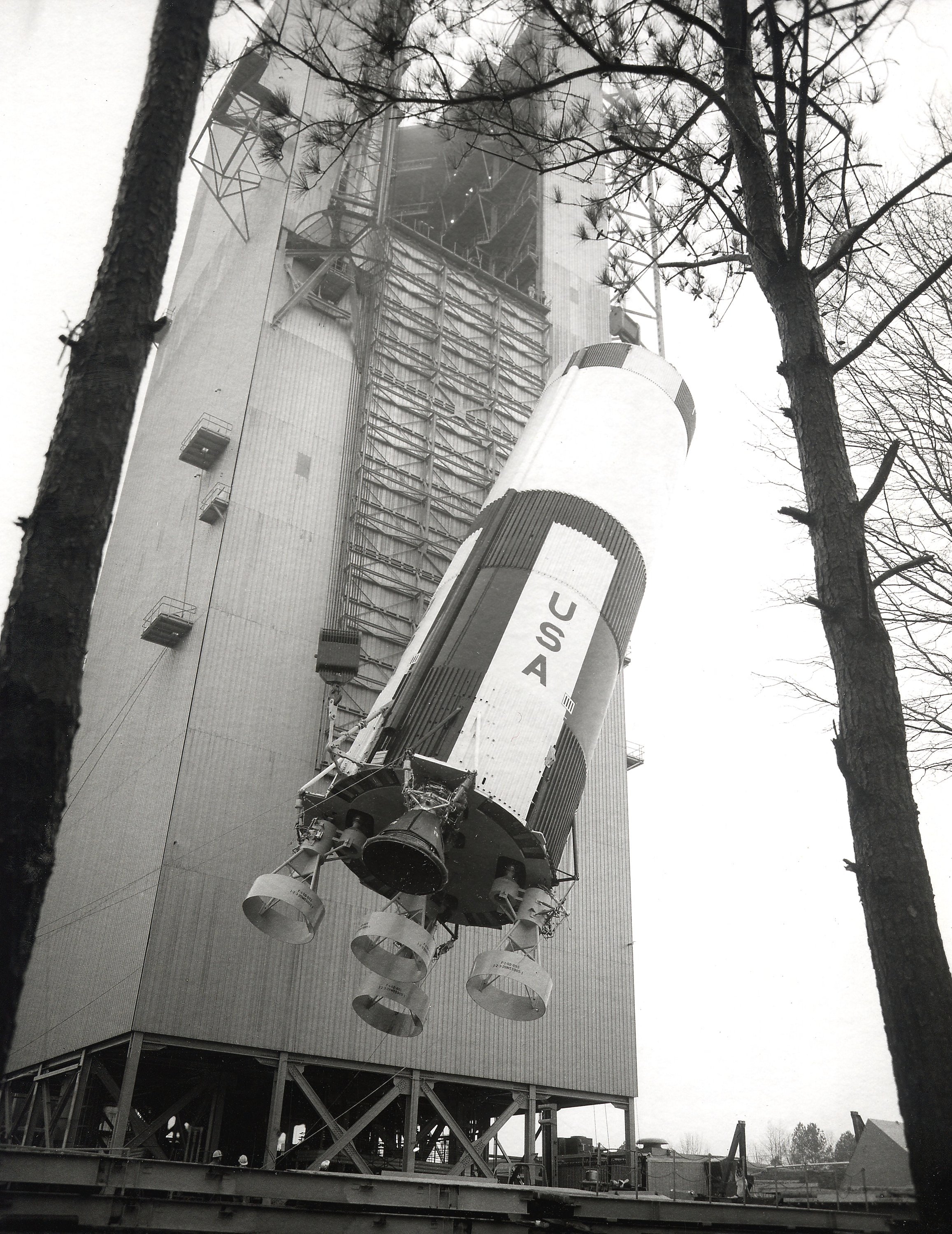
- The first stage of this Saturn V is hoisted into position for a shake test at the Saturn V Dynamic Test Stand in 1966.

- Location within Huntsville, Alabama Location within Alabama Location within the United States
- Location: Huntsville, Alabama
- Coordinates: 34°42′38.2″N 86°39′25.6″W
- Built: 1964
- Architect: NASA-Marshall Space Flight Center; Boeing Aircraft
- NRHP reference No.: 78000500

Significant dates
- Added to NRHP: November 22, 1978
- Designated NHL: February 10, 1987

The Saturn V Dynamic Test Vehicle, designated SA-500D, is a prototype Saturn V rocket used by NASA to test the performance of the rocket when vibrated to simulate the shaking which subsequent rockets would experience during launch. It was the first full-scale Saturn V completed by the Marshall Space Flight Center (MSFC). Though SA-500D never flew, it was instrumental in the development of the Saturn V rocket which propelled the first human missions to the Moon as part of the Apollo program. Built under the direction of Wernher von Braun, it served as the test vehicle for all of the Saturn support facilities at MSFC.

SA-500D is the only Saturn V on display that was used for its intended purpose, and the only one to have been assembled prior to museum display. It is on permanent display at the U.S. Space & Rocket Center, Huntsville, Alabama.

== Pre-flight configurations ==
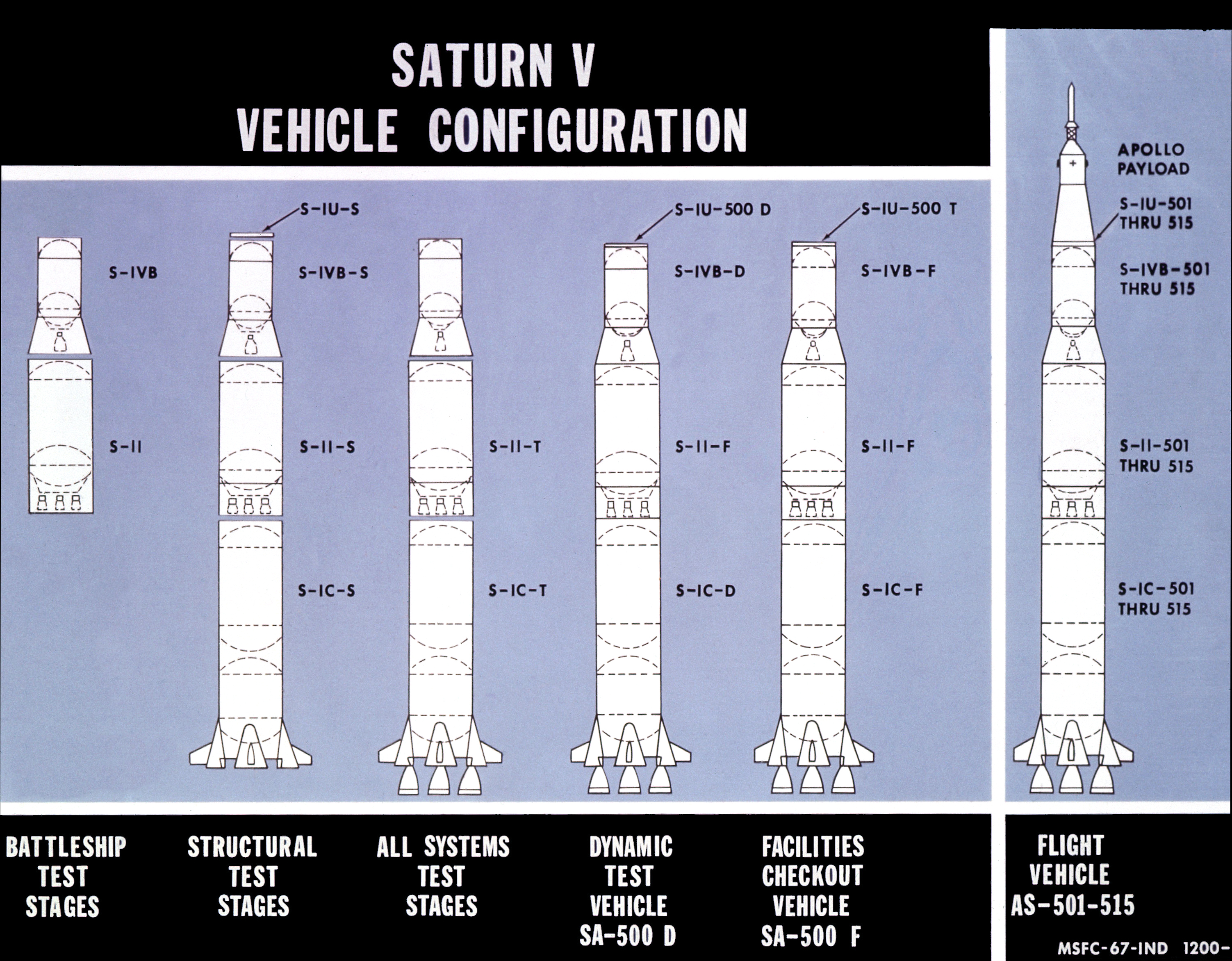
Saturn V configurations

Before a Saturn V could be launched, engineers needed to verify that their design had accounted for everything the rocket would encounter on its journey, from assembly to the launchpad and from Earth to the Moon. To validate the Saturn V design and procedures, they created five pre-flight configurations for testing. These configurations were subjected to tests simulating all aspects of flight preparations and flight itself, and all the tests needed to demonstrate satisfactory results before MSFC would certify the Saturn V to fly.

SA-500D was one of the five pre-flight configurations of the Saturn V. This configuration showed the Saturn V's "bending and vibration characteristics" and verified "the adequacy of guidance and control systems' design." The rocket's 7,610,000 pounds-force (33.9 MN) of thrust would generate vigorous shaking and it was important to see that the rocket would not shake apart or vibrate itself off-course.

Other pre-flight configurations were:

- Battleship test model, used for initial engine firing and design improvements
- Structural test model, to certify the structure for loads during launch at the anticipated temperatures, and to assess the stiffness of each stage
- SA-500F, the facilities checkout model, verify launch facilities, train launch crews, and develop test and checkout procedures.
- S-1C-T and S-II-T, all-systems test model of the S-IC first stage and S-II second stage for static firing of engines in the flight configuration

The vehicle designated SA-500D did not include an Apollo spacecraft, but boilerplate parts were used during testing to verify the entire system.

== Development of the test article ==
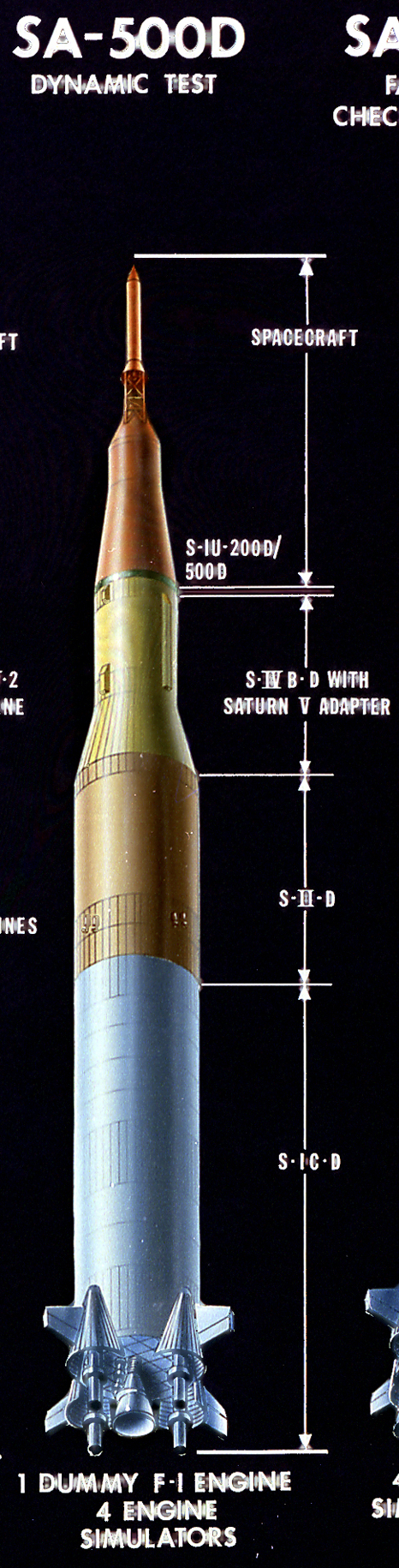
Diagram of SA-500D

The Saturn V consisted of three stages and an Instrument Unit (IU). The first stage, S-IC, delivered 7,610,000 pounds-force (33.9 MN) thrust and delivered the other stages to 200,000 feet (61 km). Afterwards, it was jettisoned to fall into the Atlantic Ocean and the second stage continued acceleration. The second stage, S-II, was responsible for lifting the remaining parts nearly to Earth orbit. The third stage, S-IVB provided the final push to orbit and the trans-lunar injection burn to set the Apollo spacecraft on a course to the Moon. The IU was the guidance and control computer. SA-500D was the assembly of these components for dynamic testing.

The Saturn V Dynamic Test Stand with "electrodynamic shakers" provided a table capable not only of holding the Saturn V fully assembled and fueled, but also able to simulate the vibrations that would be generated by rocket engines.

The components used for testing were developed from 1964 to 1966, and the tests conducted in 1966–67. Because the Saturn V shared some components with the Saturn IB, some of the components for SA-500D were initially used for dynamic testing with the Saturn IB stack.

In naming the individual stages, MSFC used the stage designation with a suffix indicating its purpose. For example, S-IC-D was the first stage, S-IC, for dynamic testing, and S-IC-1 was the first flight model of the first stage. Suffixes used were "S", for structural, "F" for facilities, "T" for all-systems test, and "D" for dynamic testing.

=== Apollo boilerplate ===
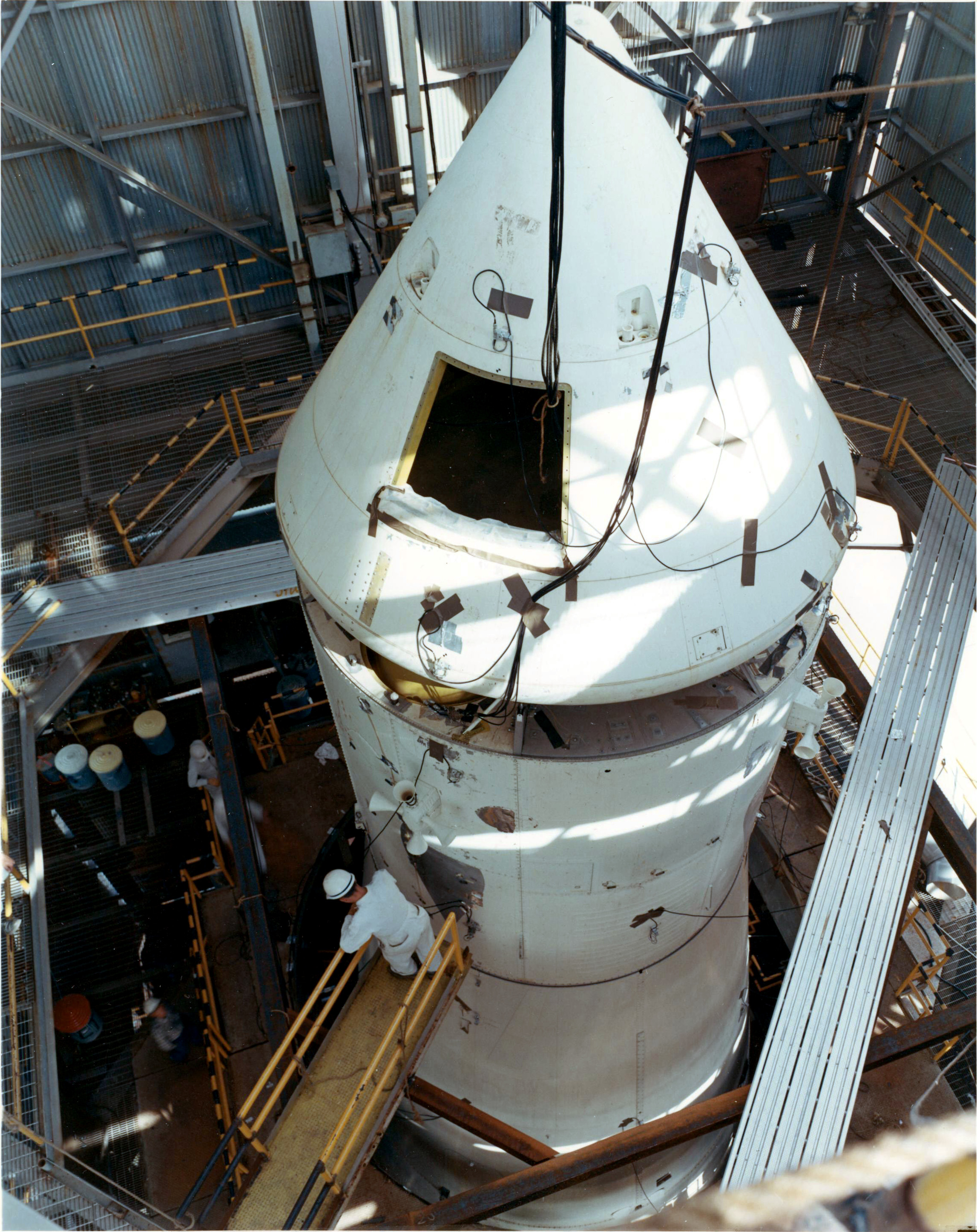
BP-27 sat atop the S-IB dressed with sensors for dynamic testing as seen here before it was used for Saturn V testing.

Development of the test article started from the top. A boilerplate Apollo spacecraft, BP-27 together with LTA-2, was used for all configurations of dynamic testing. The boilerplate took the place of actual flight hardware. Boilerplate size, shape, mass and center of gravity were the same, but it was not necessary for the entire Apollo spacecraft to be complete to commence dynamic testing. The boilerplate was outfitted with instrumentation to record data for engineering study and evaluation.

BP-27 consisted of hardware specifically built for that configuration and some hardware reassigned from other designations. The command module and launch escape system were unique to BP-27. The service module SM-010 (formerly SM-006) and the spacecraft–lunar module adapter SLA #1 were also assigned to BP-27.

BP-27 was accepted at the Marshall Space Flight Center (MSFC) in late September 1964.

Shortly thereafter, MSFC took delivery of the boilerplate lunar module, called a lunar test article and designated LTA-2. LTA-2 is the only part of SA-500D to fly in space. It was refurbished, designated LTA-2R, and flew on Apollo 6.

BP-27 was used for Saturn IB dynamic testing, shipped to Kennedy Space Center (KSC) to be a component of SA-500F, and shipped back to MSFC for full-stack testing with SA-500D.

=== Third stage ===
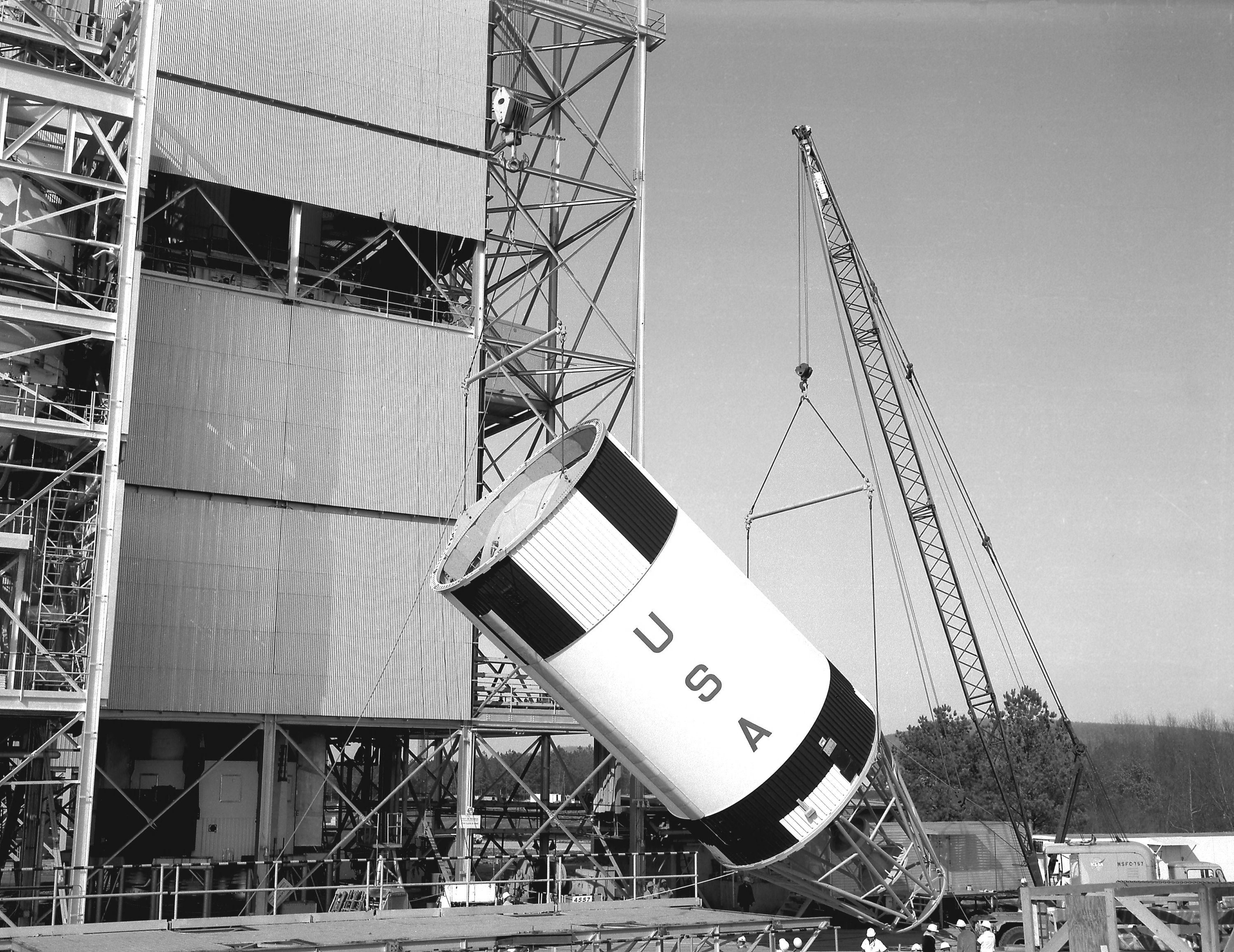
S-IVB-D arrives at MSFC for testing.

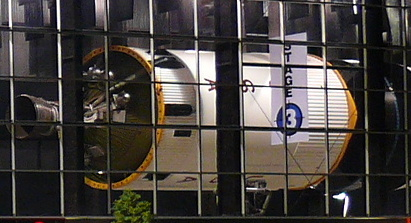
S-IVB-D at Davidson Center

The third stage, S-IVB-D arrived at MSFC before any other Saturn V stages because it was destined for dynamic testing in the Saturn IB first. It was assembled by Douglas near Los Angeles. With ceremony and dignitaries for the first Douglas-built S-IVB stage, it set out by barge December 8, 1964, and made its way to New Orleans via the Panama Canal, the Mississippi, Ohio, and Tennessee Rivers to MSFC, where it arrived on January 4, 1965. The same day, MSFC took delivery of the first stage of the Saturn IB for dynamic and facilities checkout testing, S-IB-D/F. The parts were assembled together with the instrument unit designated S-IU-200D/500D (see below) and BP-27 for dynamic testing in the Saturn IB configuration from February to September 1965 before it was allocated to the Saturn V configuration.

=== Instrument unit ===
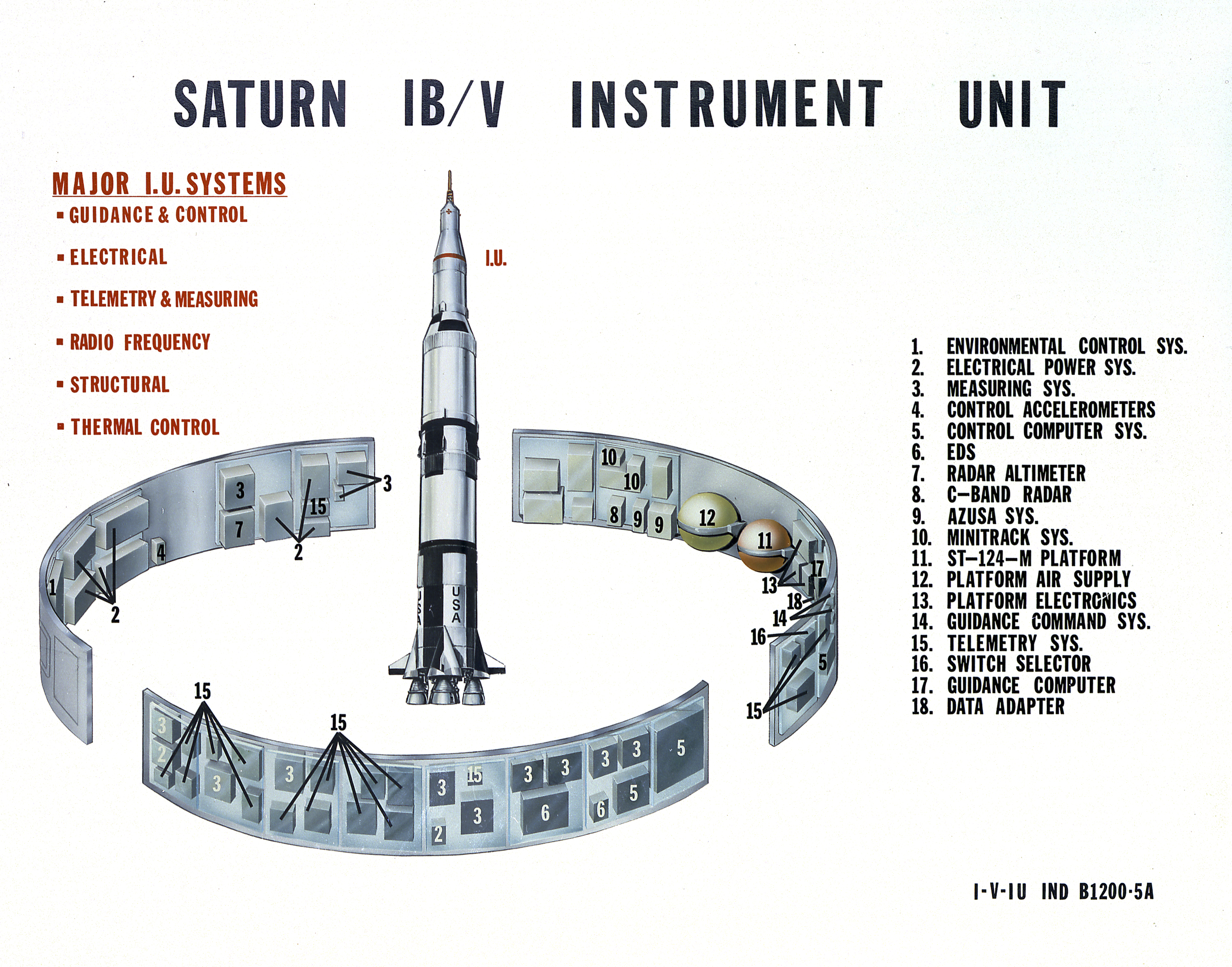
The IU was the electronics hub for Saturn V.

The Saturn V instrument unit served as the electronics hub for the first three stages of the rocket, controlling engine firing, guidance, stage separation, and climate for the three stages below. It consisted of two main parts, a rigid ring for structure, and within that, electronics.

Instrument units had a slightly different numbering scheme than the other parts. S-IU-200D/500D was for use with the SA-200D dynamic test article – a Saturn IB, and also for use with SA-500D, the Saturn V.

IBM won the contract to build electronics for the IU, and so, by 1964, constructed a $14 million four-building complex including a manufacturing facility with clean room in Huntsville.

The IU's structural ring had two responsibilities: provide a mounting location for IBM's electronics and hold everything on top of it. It needed to be structurally sound enough to hold the weight of the lunar module, service module, command module, and the three astronauts during the acceleration provided by three mighty stages of rocket beneath. The rings were all fabricated at MSFC.

The IU for SA-500D was not the first built. MSFC built S-IU-200V/500V for vibration testing from September to November 1964. Wyle Labs tested it as part of the Saturn I-B program.

S-IU-200D/500D was the second IU to be built, with the ring completed in January 1965 and electronic components from IBM installed by February 1. It was the last piece necessary for dynamic testing in the Saturn IB program. It was stacked together with S-IVB-D, S-IB-D, and BP-27 for Saturn IB testing through much of 1965. On October 8, 1965, it began dynamic testing for the Saturn V program as part of SA-500D.

=== First stage ===
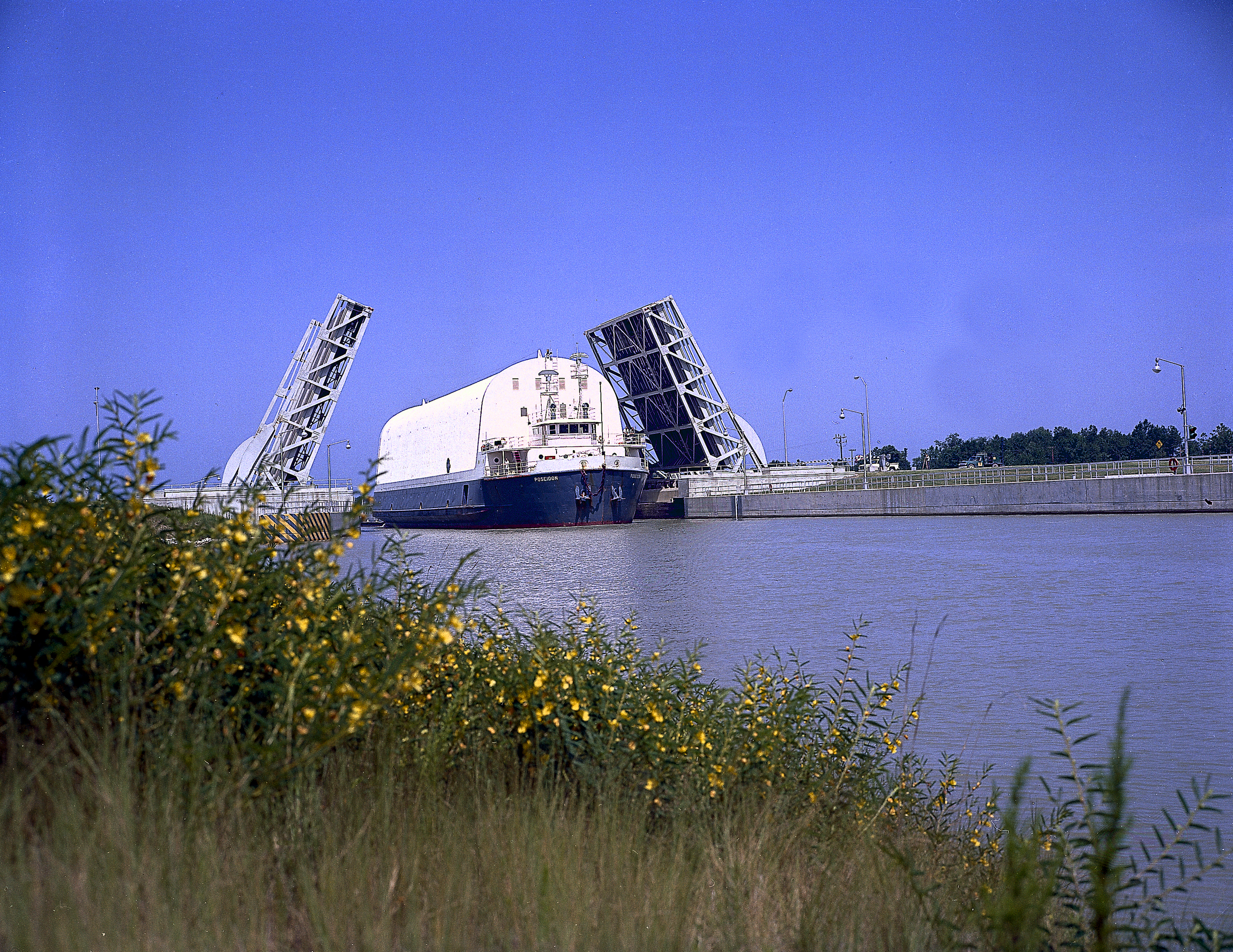
The NASA's Poseidon ferried S-IC-D to MSFC on the barge's first trip.

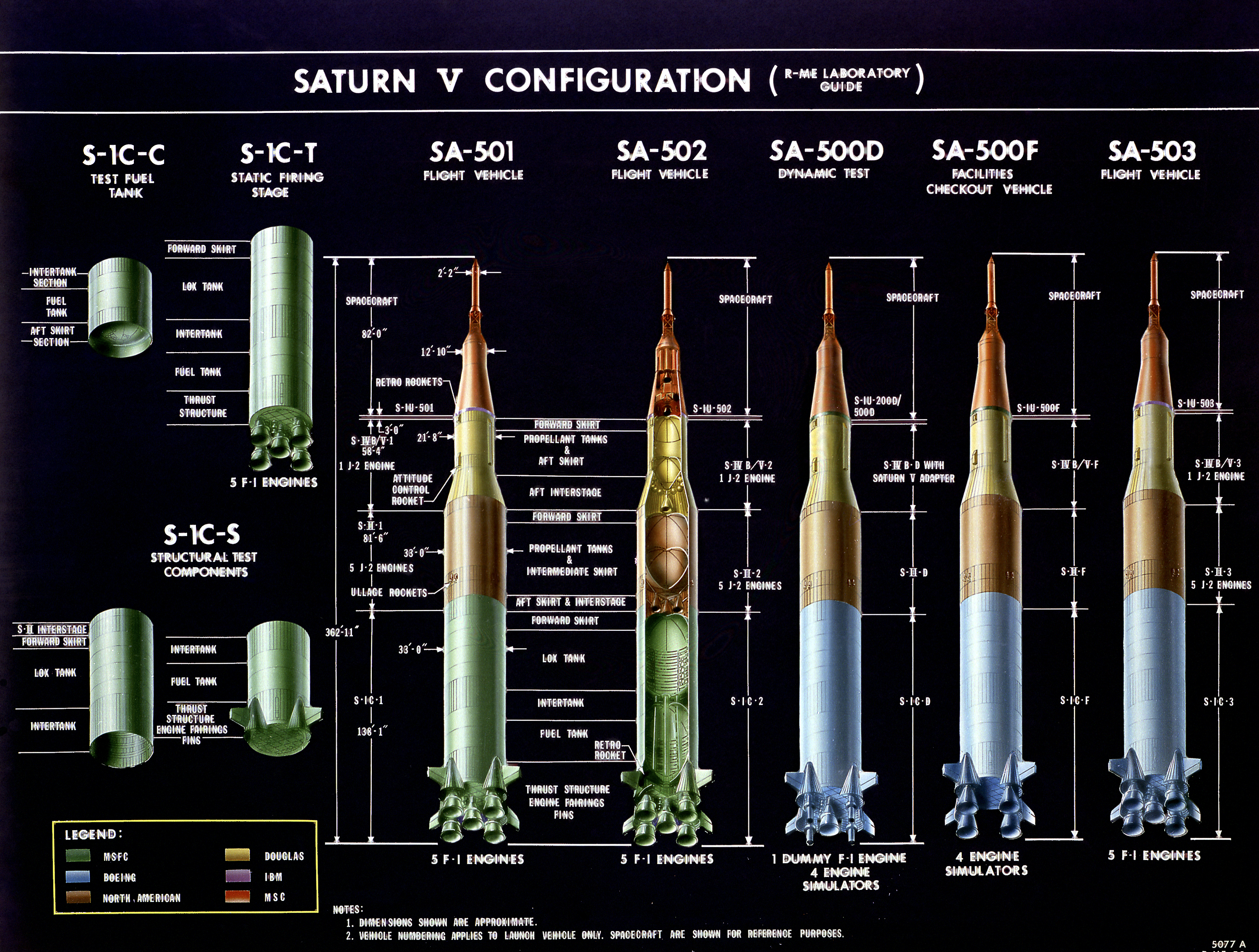
Saturn V testing and flight vehicle configurations

MSFC built the first three S-IC test first stages for the Saturn V: S-IC-T, the S-IC-S, and the S-IC-F. They also built the first two flight stages, S-IC-1 and S-IC-2. S-IC-D was the first to be built by Boeing at the Michoud Assembly Facility, New Orleans using the tooling that had been developed in Huntsville.

S-IC-D, was under construction on September 9, 1965, when Hurricane Betsy struck the Michoud Assembly Facility. The building housing the stage sustained severe damage, but the stage itself was repaired promptly.

S-IC-D set out on the maiden voyage of NASA barge Poseidon to Marshall Space Flight Center on October 6, 1965, and arrived at MSFC October 13. The first stage was lifted into place in the dynamic test stand January 13, 1966. Said one observer, "Fog and clouds hovered around the top of the 360 foot (110 m) tall test stand most of the day while the 300,000 pounds (140,000 kg) stage was being lifted from its transporter into place inside the stand, said to be the tallest building in Alabama."

=== Second stage ===
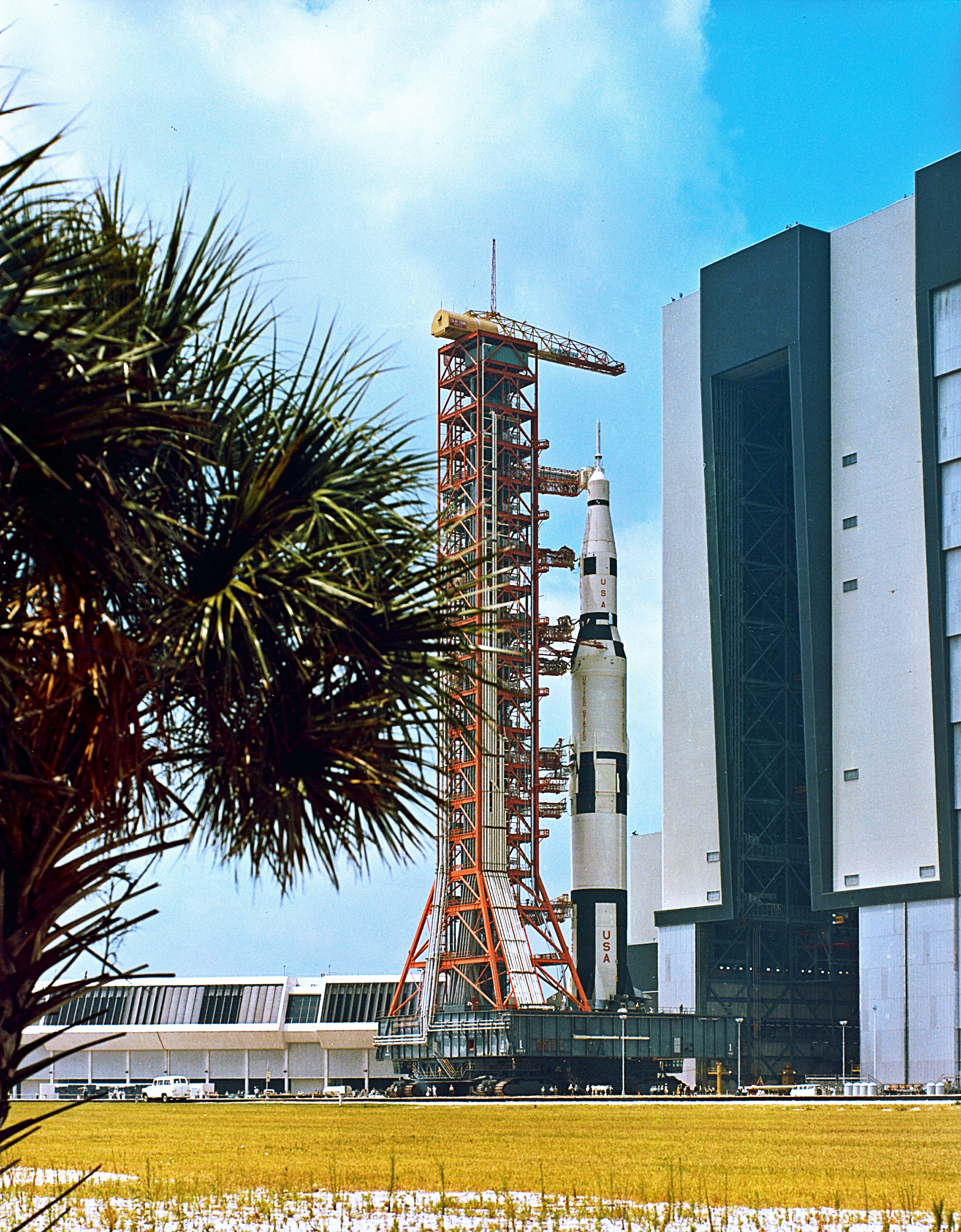
S-II-F/D rolled out to the launch pad as part of SA-500F.

The second stage of SA-500D had a complex history. The second stage, S-II-D had been on order, but that part was cancelled February 19, 1965. The plan was to use another test article for dynamic testing as well as its other purpose. Two such test articles were destroyed during testing after having been designated for the dynamic test phase. The actual article used in SA-500D was named in the third re-allocation, when S-II-F, the facilities checkout article, was designated S-II-F/D.

S-II-S, which North American Aviation's Space and Information Systems Division (S&ID) at Seal Beach had completed by January 31, was re-designated as S-II-S/D to be used for dynamic testing. S-II-S/D would not survive its final structural test on September 29, 1965, but the test was exercising considerable margin above the structural integrity required for flight.

This video frame shows S-II-S/D after it failed in final structural tests. These excerpts from Saturn V Quarterly Film Reports show SA-500D coming together for testing.

In January 1966, the all-systems test S-II-T was re-designated S-II-T/D, so that it might be used for dynamic testing as well as engine firing. S-II-T/D completed integrated checkout of ground support facilities at MTF on February 3, 1966. S-II-T/D's engines were fired five times at MTF from April to May, including a full-duration test. On May 28, 1966, S-II-T/D was undergoing a pressure test to find a hydrogen leak, but the hydrogen pressure sensors and switches had been disconnected unbeknownst to the second-shift crew when they tried to pressurize the tank. Five technicians sustained minor injuries. MSFC convened an investigation that night, and the team completed the report in two days.

After the S-II-T/D destruction, a third article was assigned to dynamic test duties. Facilities checkout article S-II-F became the dynamic test article designated S-II-F/D. S-II-F was shipped from S&ID, Seal Beach, California on February 20, 1966, to Kennedy Space Center where it arrived March 4. It filled in the final part of SA-500F to check out facilities for processing the Saturn V, replacing a dumbbell-shaped temporary stage of the same length and weight as an S-II stage. SA-500F was assembled in the Vehicle Assembly Building where it was mated to S-IC-F on March 28 and S-IVB-F the next day.

SA-500F was completed in the Vehicle Assembly Building (VAB), tested for stability against swaying in the wind, and rolled out to the launch pad May 25, 1966, on Mobile Launcher-1 (ML-1).

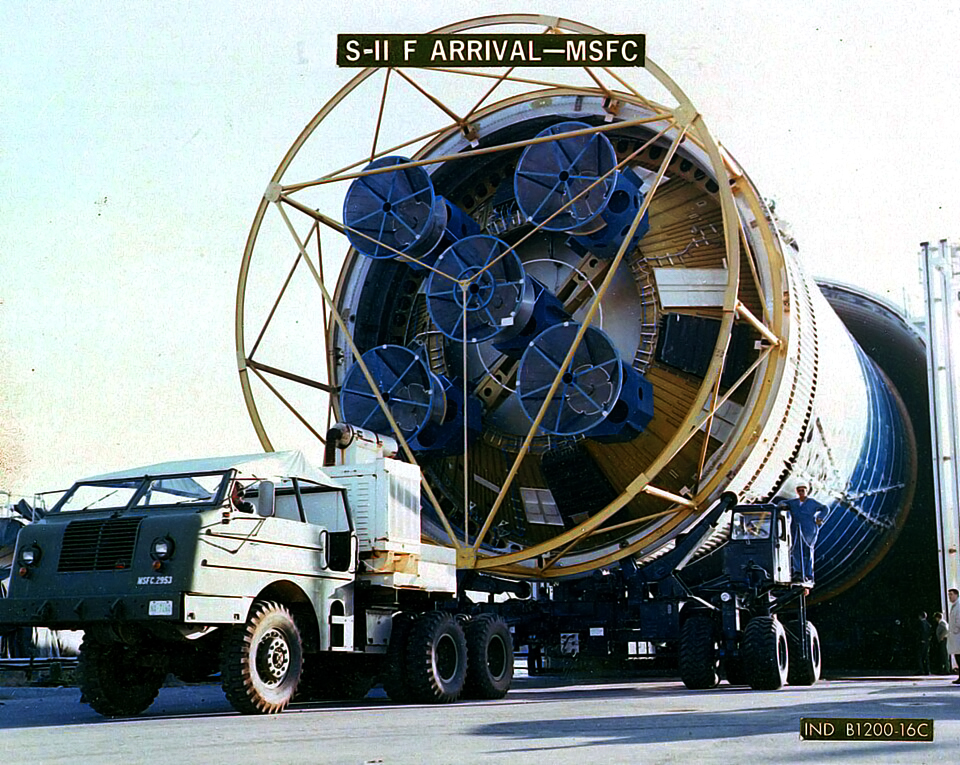
S-II-F/D arrives at MSFC.

Hurricane Alma interrupted exercises as SA-500F was rolled back to the VAB on June 8, though the ground crew supposed the rollback was more of an exercise than necessity because winds remained below critical for the entire storm. It was returned to Launch Complex 39A two days later and finally returned to the VAB October 14, 1966 for disassembly.

After facilities checkout at KSC was completed, the remaining components of SA-500F were then transferred to MSFC for inclusion in SA-500D: the Apollo boilerplate BP-27 and S-II-F/D. The second stage was modified for dynamic testing, and shipped by Posideon from KSC on October 29 to arrive at MSFC November 10, 1966.

== Dynamic testing ==
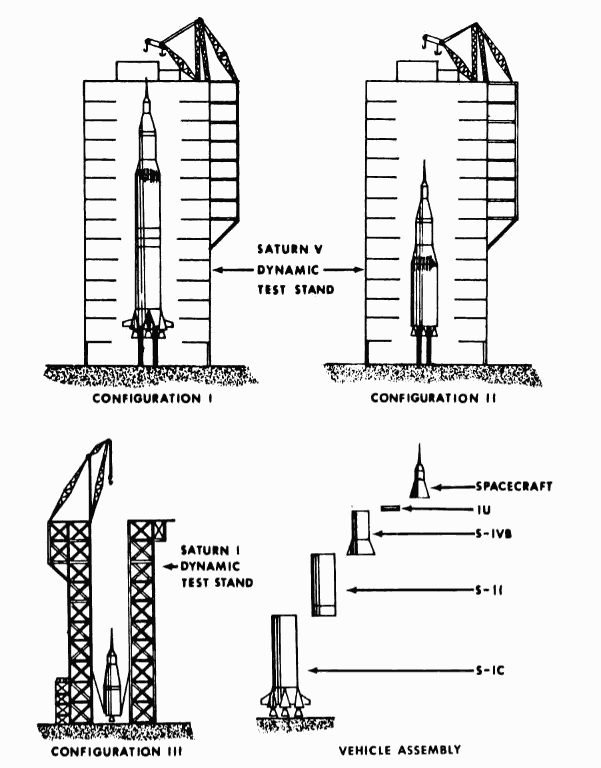
Dynamic testing involved three vehicle configurations with various fuel loads.

Engineers needed a detailed knowledge of the space vehicle's dynamic flight characteristics to design structural, guidance, and flight control systems. They initially used analytical data that had not been substantiated by test for design criteria. The dynamic test vehicle test project determined the dynamic characteristics of the space vehicle and verified earlier analyses.

The objectives of the dynamic tests were to:

# Determine the space vehicle structural dynamic characteristics under conditions simulating flight configuration and environment insofar as practicable.

1. Determine the optimum location for flight sensors and obtain experimental transfer functions for the control system.
2. Determine the physical mating capability of stages and modules.
3. Compare dynamic test results with subsequent flight test results for continuous development of dynamic test techniques and facilities to assure the highest possible degree of accuracy in the development of future vehicle structures prior to flight.
4. Determine the space vehicle dynamic characteristics under conditions simulating transport from the Vehicle Assembly Building to the launch pad insofar as practicable.

— NASA, Saturn V Dynamic Test Vehicle Test Project Plan

Dynamic tests came in three configurations, one for each phase of Saturn V-powered flight. Configuration I focused on testing the entire stack, as if the vehicle had just been launched. Configuration II exercised the stack as if the first stage had jettisoned and the second stage were firing, and configuration III tested just the third stage and Apollo spacecraft. Tests began with Configuration III in the Saturn IB dynamic test facility, while the Saturn V Dynamic Test Stand, first, and second stages were still under construction. Configuration I testing followed in the Saturn V dynamic test stand, then Configuration II in the same place.

Configuration III testing took place in late 1965.

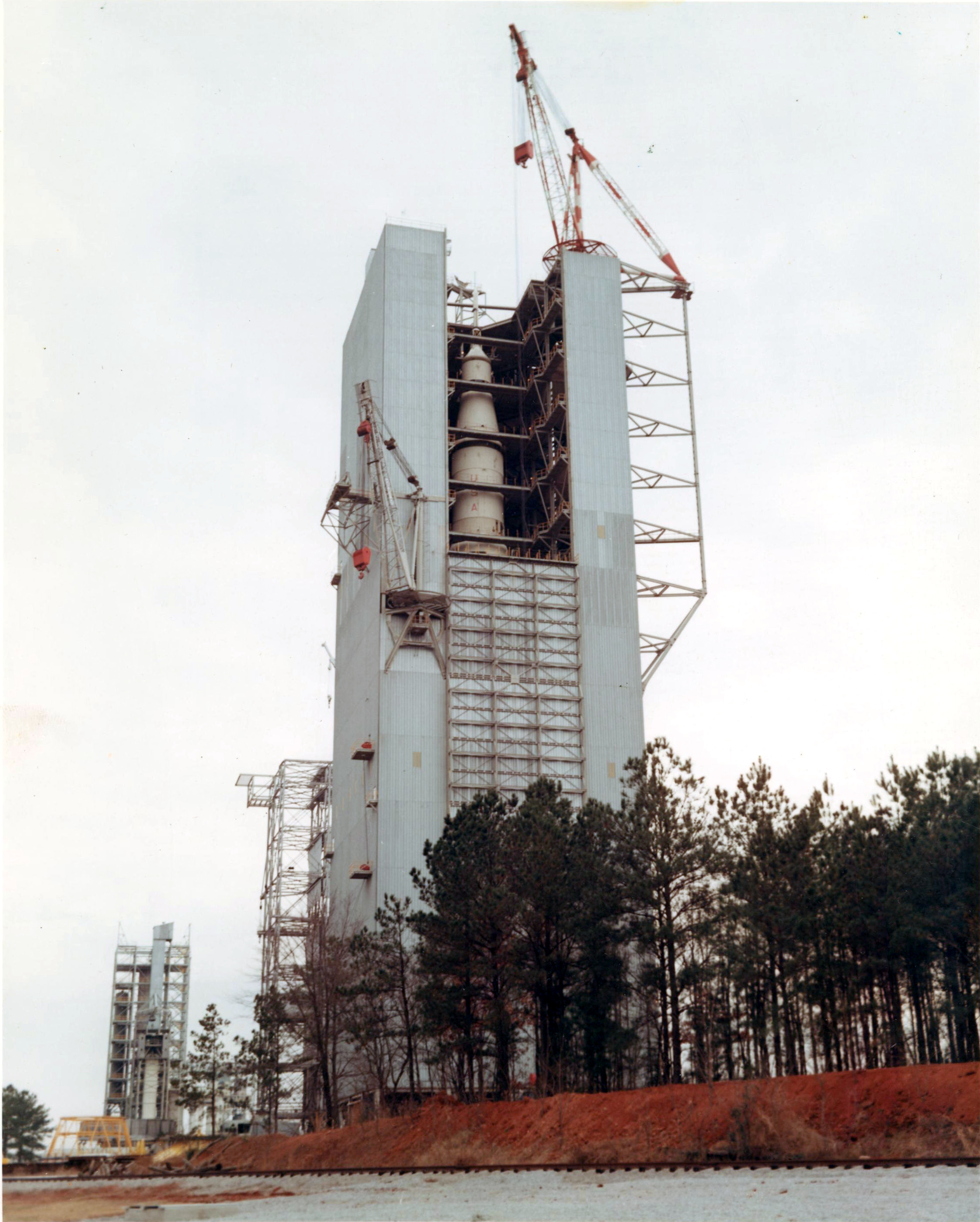
In Configuration One, SA-500D was fully assembled inside the dynamic test facility.

Configuration I dynamic tests required the first stage of the Saturn V, which was loaded into the test stand January 13, 1966. Testing would have to wait for the last piece, the second stage, to arrive.

With all the components at MSFC as of November 10, 1966, the second stage was stacked atop the first inside the Dynamic Test Stand on November 23. The third stage was added to the stack November 30, and the Instrument Unit and boilerplate Apollo were installed in December. The rocket was stacked and ready for "Configuration One" testing.

Configuration One Testing ran from January through March. Testing produced "several minor irregularities indicating the need for possible engineering changes" which were addressed during March, 1967.

Configuration Two testing followed, in which the first stage was removed from the stack to simulate conditions after the first stage had jettisoned.

Dynamic testing examined "the vehicle's response to lateral, longitudinal, and torsional excitation, simulating those that would be experienced in flight. The vehicle was "mounted on a hydrodynamic support system made up of four hydraulic/pneumatic pedestals to permit a simulated unrestrained reaction." Engineers tested vibrations in one plane at a time with different amounts of ballast simulating "fuel load at critical time points in the flight trajectory."

NASA historian Mike Wright summarizes the testing:

Combined, the tests involved 450 hours of shaking to gather data from some 800 measuring points. A simulated Apollo capsule with the same weight and same center of gravity as the spacecraft being checked out for launch at Kennedy Space Center were placed on top of the rocket. Forces were applied to the tail of the rocket to simulate engine thrusting, and various other flight factors were fed to the vehicle to test reactions. During some of the shaking tests, the rocket moved as much as six inches at the top and up to three inches at the bottom. The tests were mandatory before the Center could certify that the guidance system would hold the rocket on course when it was launched.

On August 3, 1967, MSFC announced the successful completion of the dynamic test program, thereby declaring dynamics and structures of the Saturn V ready for its first launch later in the year. The dynamic testing resulted in "several slight modifications" to the final flight vehicle.

The first Saturn V launch came three months later, with Apollo 4. The dynamic test article LTA-2 was refurbished as LTA-2R and flown on the next Saturn V launch, Apollo 6.

After dynamic testing, the second stage returned to KSC for a time for launchpad B checkout.

== Public display ==
After all tests were complete, the SA-500D was reassembled in Huntsville, this time for public exhibition at the Alabama Space Science Center, on land carved out of the north edge of Marshall Space Flight Center. Transport of the rocket, along with the Saturn I which would be erected vertically, to the museum, took place June 28, 1969. The rocket would be displayed lying down on the southern edge of a rocket park with its predecessor rockets, near a Saturn 1 standing erect and a moonscape complete with model lunar module and a flag. SA-500D was installed in 1969, and the (renamed) Alabama Space and Rocket Center opened in 1970 showcasing articles that could otherwise only be seen by NASA and Army workers at Redstone Arsenal. The first stage sat on a low-boy trailer and the others in cradles. The instrument unit was put on display inside the museum, and interstages were given roofs and converted to educational rides for the museum.

SA-500D was added to the List of Historic Mechanical Engineering Landmarks by the American Society of Mechanical Engineers in 1980 and declared a National Historic Landmark by the National Park Service in 1987.

In 1989, the museum assumed its current name, U.S. Space & Rocket Center.

SA-500D displayed outdoors, 1969 to 2007

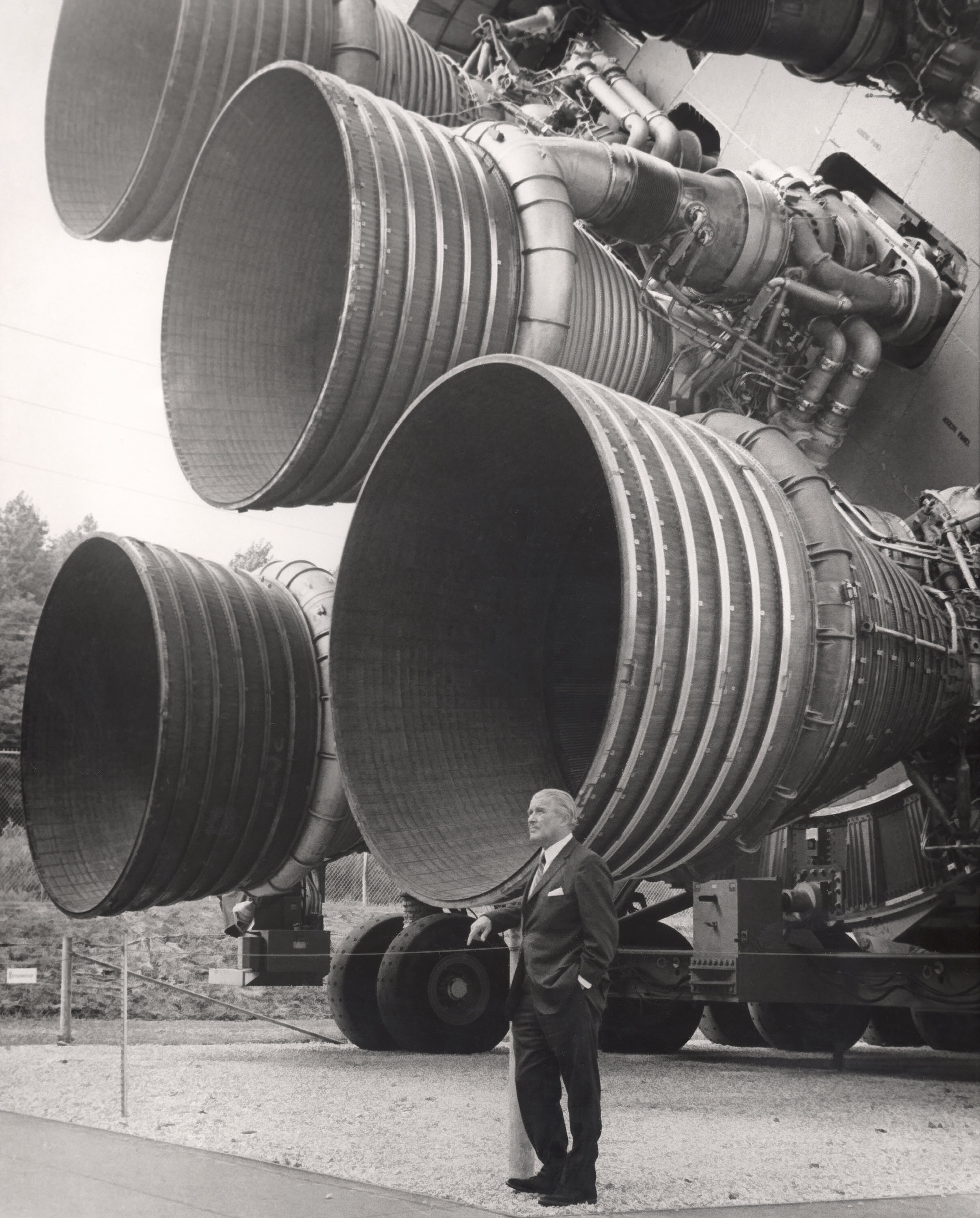
Wernher von Braun at the base of SA-500D first stage

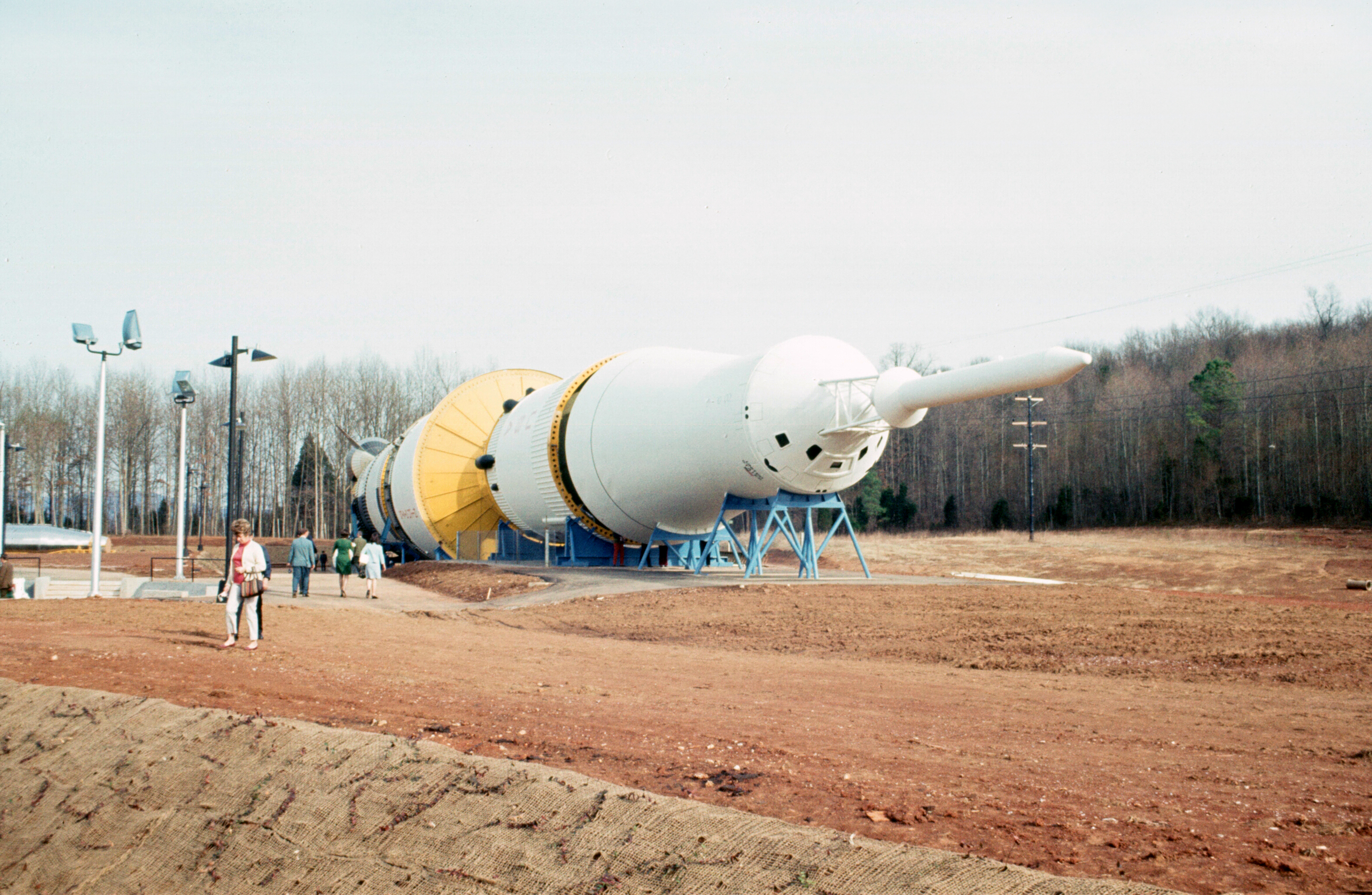
The 363-foot-long Saturn V at the Alabama Space and Rocket Center, March 1970

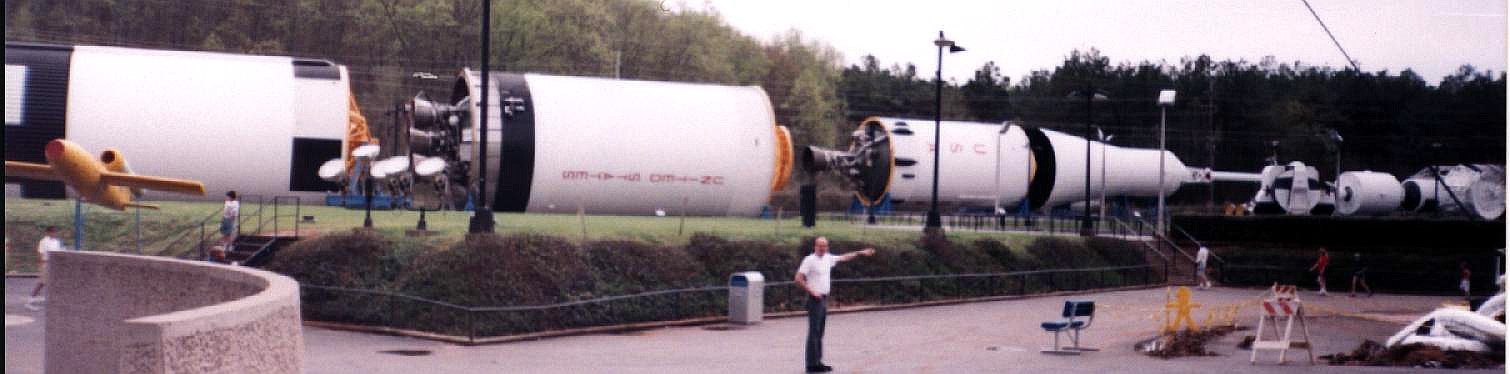
Saturn V outdoor display

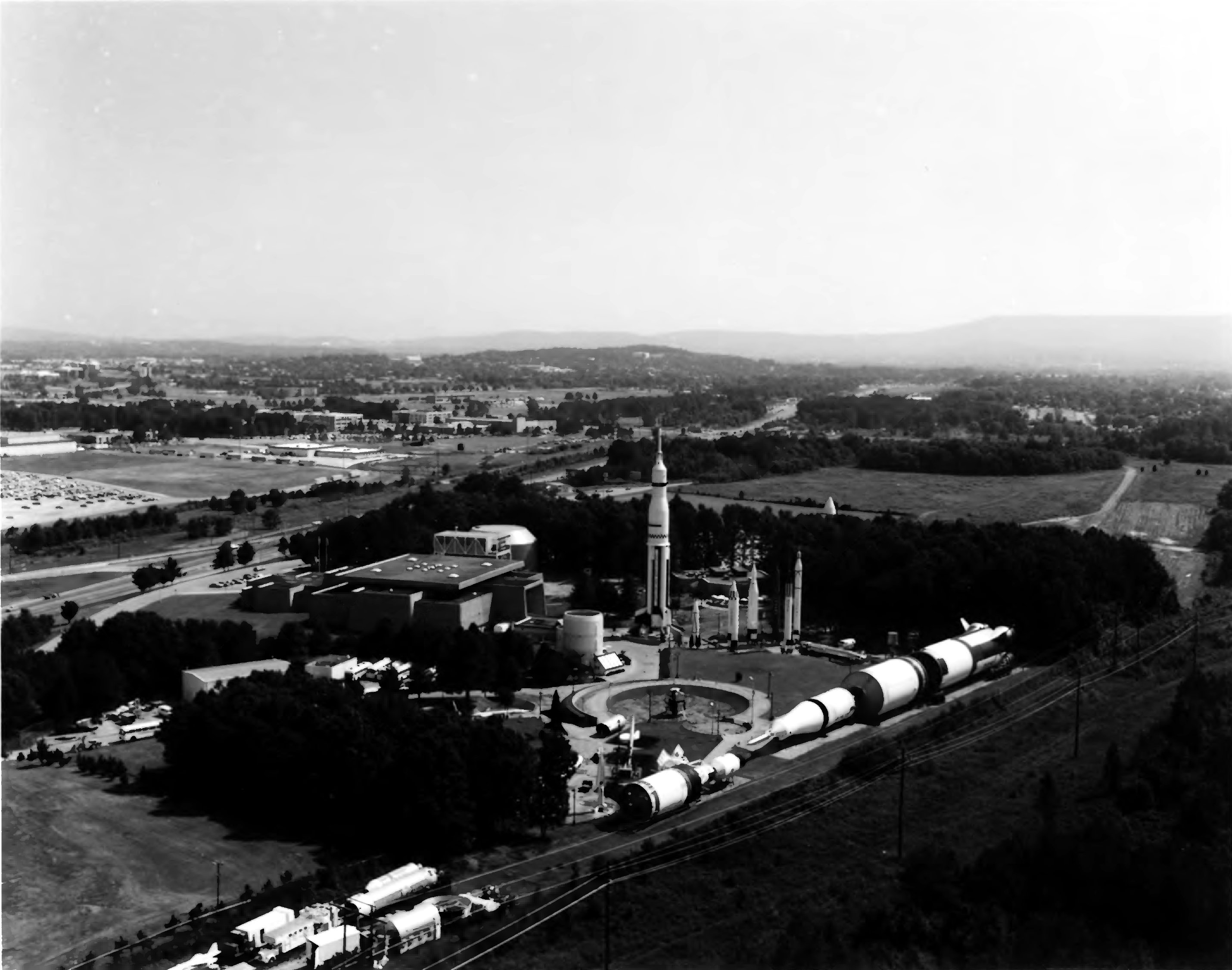
Alabama Space and Rocket Center, looking Northeast, 1982

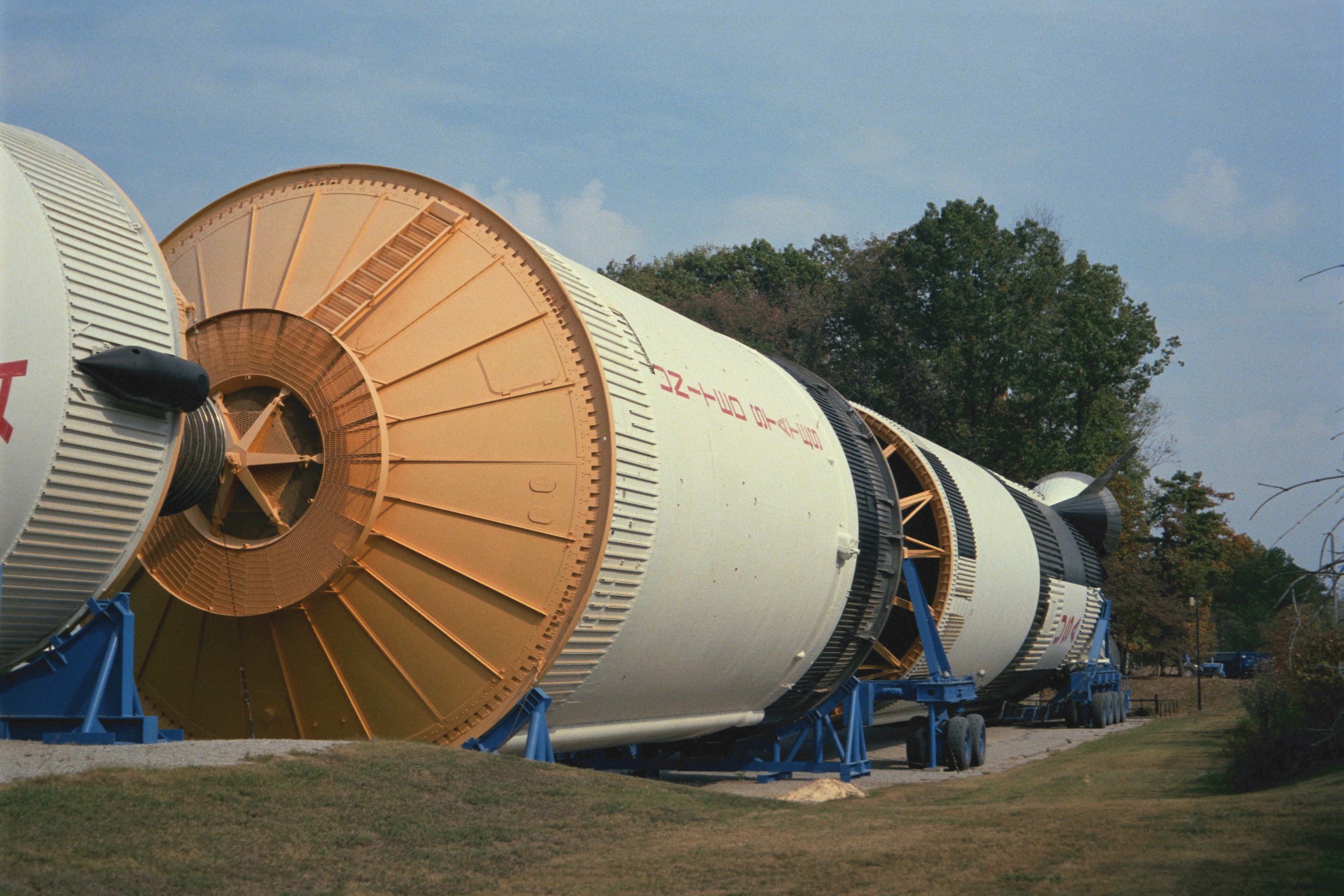
Saturn V outdoor display

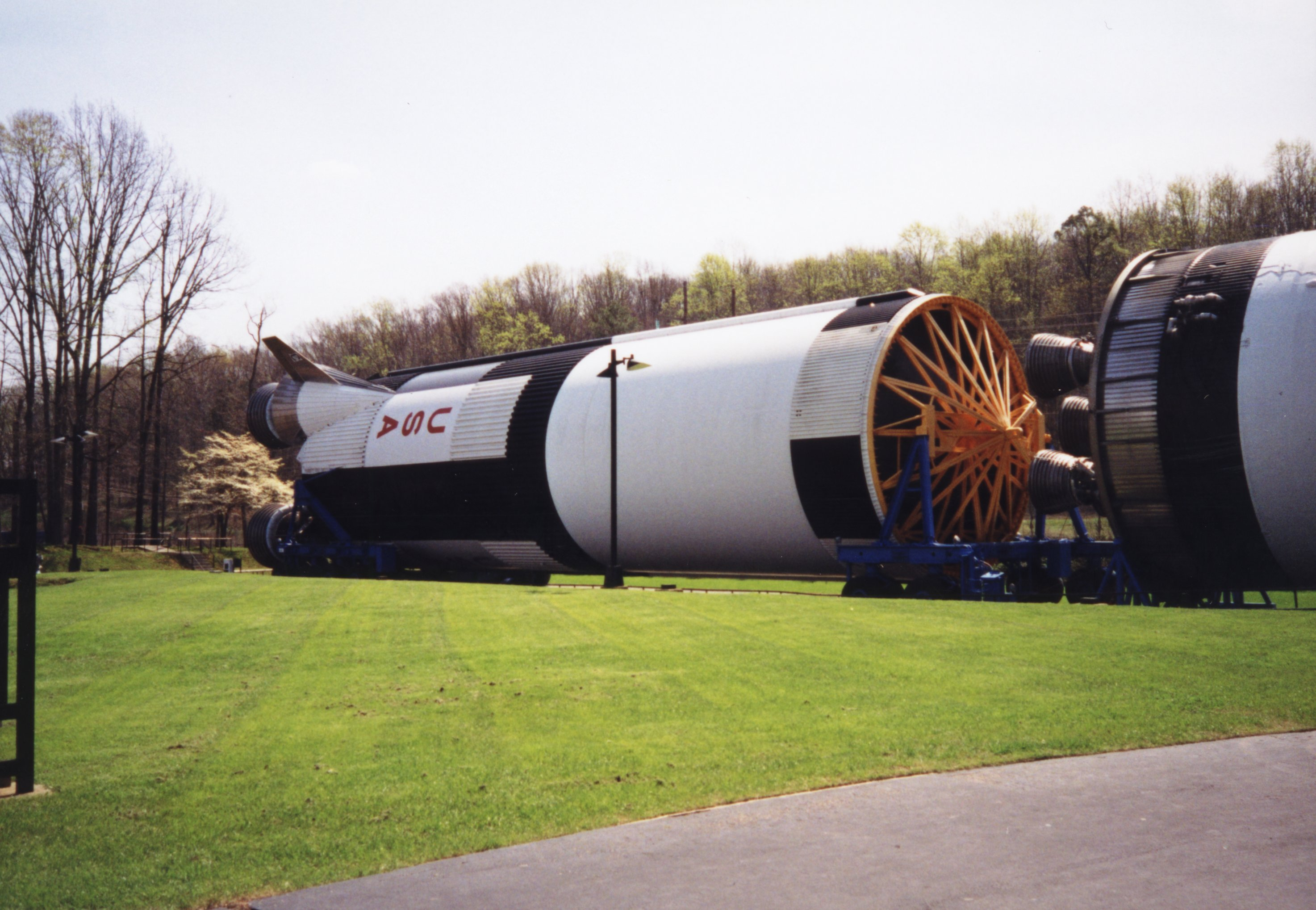
Saturn V at the United States Space & Rocket Center, 2007

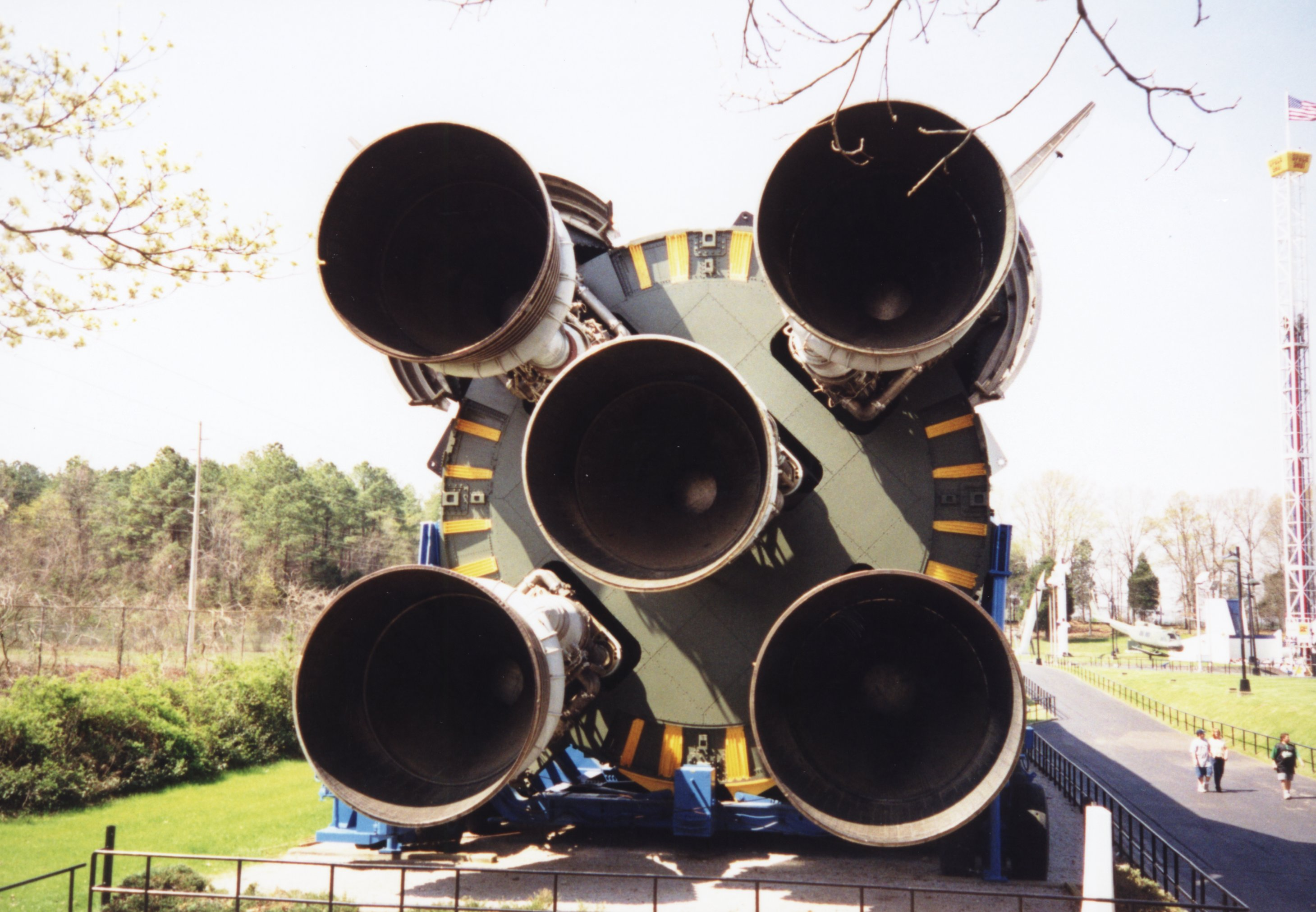
Saturn V boosters at United States Space & Rocket Center, 2007

=== Restoration ===
After decades of the vehicle resting unprotected outdoors, the U.S. Space & Rocket Center commissioned the restoration of the vehicle in 2005. Analysis by Conservation Solutions, Incorporated determined significant damage from both weather and pest infestations. Various materials comprising the vehicle, including metal alloys and non-metal materials such as polyurethane foam and fiberglass, exhibited significant deterioration. After conducting the analysis, full restoration of the Saturn V vehicle began in June 2005.

Restoration culminated in July 2007 when the Saturn V was moved into a building designed as protection for the artifact and to provide additional museum facilities. The move took place from July 10 to approximately July 17, starting with the first stage. The Davidson Center for Space Exploration opened in January 2008.

On May 3, 2012, an unknown person fired three .308 caliber bullets from Interstate 565 at the Davidson Center, breaking three windows. Two bullets struck SA-500D's third stage marring paint and leaving dents. No people were harmed. The damage was repaired within two months.

=== Components on display ===
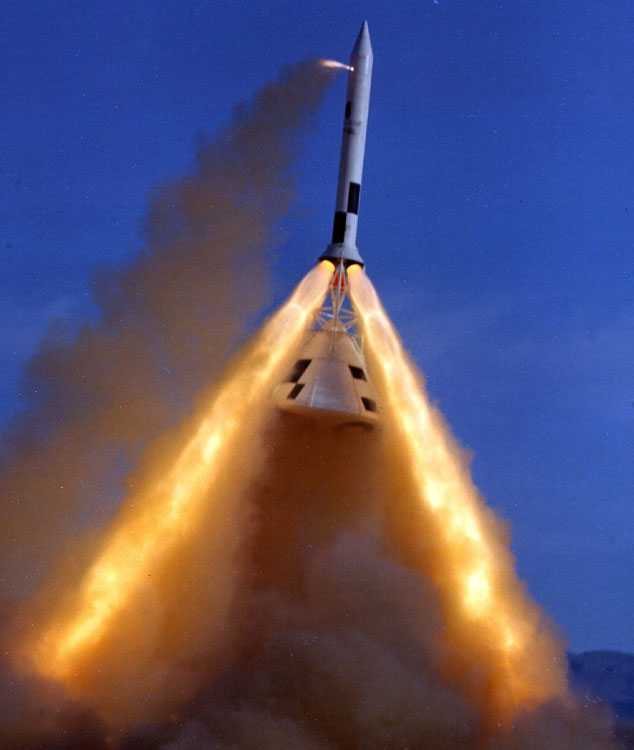
BP-23A stands in for an Apollo command module in a test of the launch escape system.

This display consists of S-IC-D, S-II-F/D, and S-IVB-D, S-IU-200D/500D, an SLA (possibly SLA-1), SM-010, and BP-23A.

For the Block II Environmental Control System tests, the assembly of Launch Escape System (LES) 006, Boilerplate (BP) 006 and SM 006 were used. After ECS testing, CM-006 was scrapped, while the LES 006 was reassigned to Boilerplate 14, and SM-006 was reassigned to SM 010. LES 006/BP-14 was later reassigned a second time to BP-23A, used on PA-2 (Pad Abort 2), and was destroyed as part of testing. The CM for BP 23A remained, and wound up on the SA-500D display, with former SM-006/SM-010.

SM-006/SM-010 was to be used at MSFC for testing, but testing was canceled, and SM-010 was reassigned for use with BP-27. At some point, it seems this SM was repurposed to be used with BP-23A and the SA-500D display.

BP-23 launched for A-002 to test the launch escape system and recovery parachutes on December 8, 1964. It was refurbished, designated BP-23A, and exercised the launch escape system again in Launch Pad Abort Test 2, June 29, 1965.

BP-27, the dynamic test boilerplate article, is on display at the U.S. Space and Rocket Center atop the vertical Saturn I.

Other Apollo and Saturn artifacts on display include the Apollo 16 command module, the Apollo 12 Mobile Quarantine Facility, a Lunar Lander with a test article landing stage (MSFC 76545) and a replica ascent stage, and another Instrument Unit.

Restored SA-500D

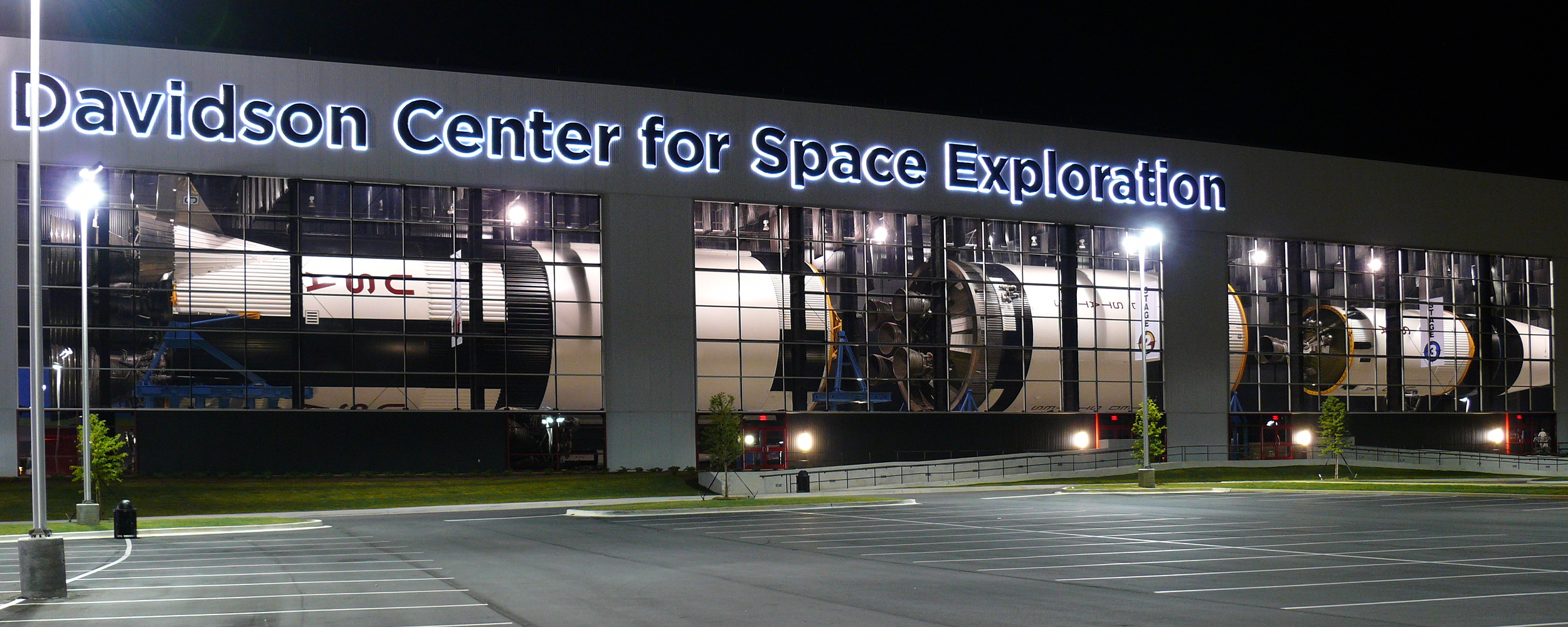
SA-500D hangs in the main hall of the Davidson Center for Space Exploration, 2008

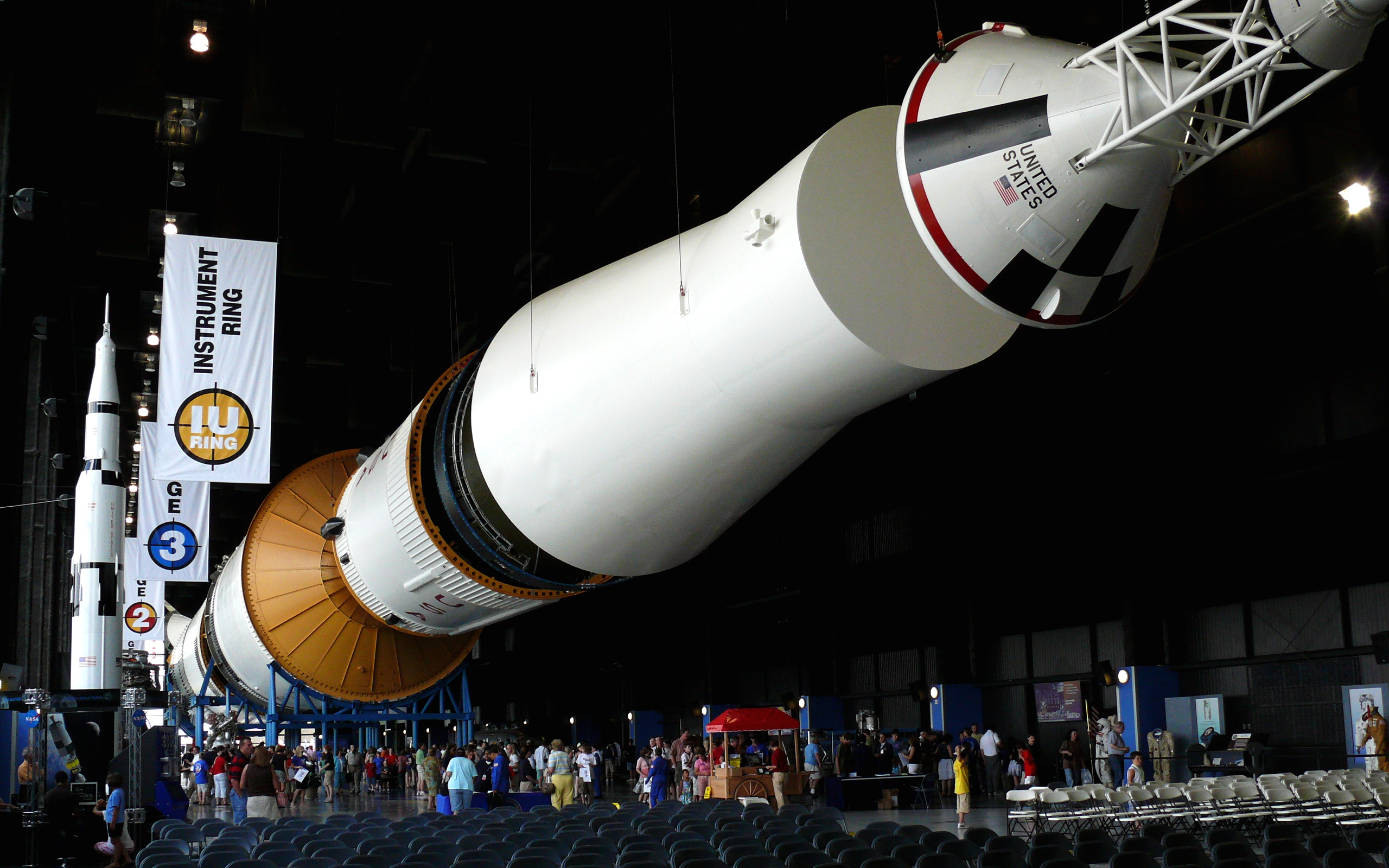
SA-500D on display, 2008

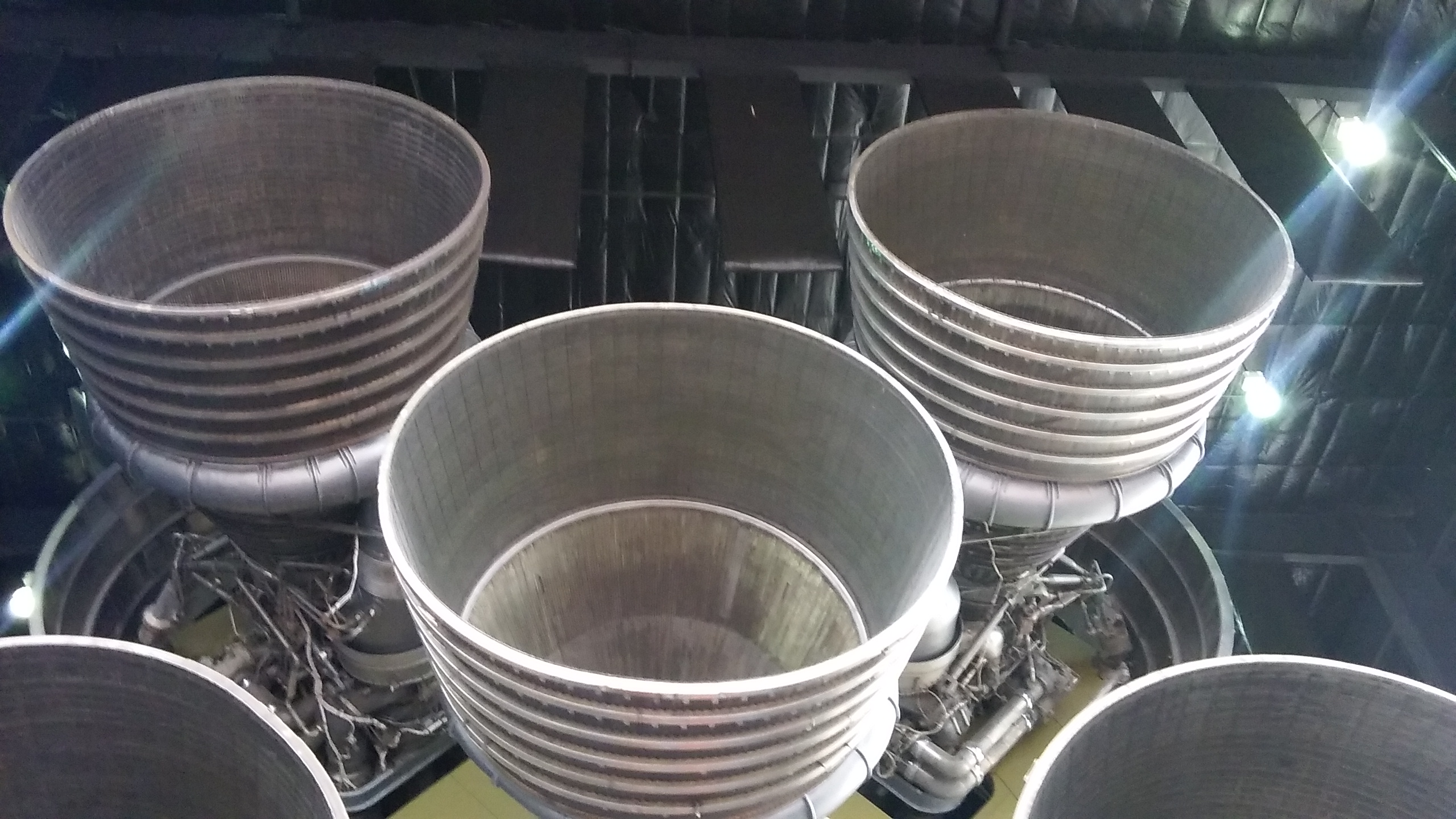
First stage engines, 2016

== See also ==
- SA-500F, the Saturn V Facilities Integration Vehicle
