= WF =

WF may refer to:

== Arts and entertainment ==
- Power Rangers Wild Force, a 2002 television series
- The Wallflowers, a rock band (formed 1989)
- Western Forces, a fictional military alliance of California and Texas in a 2024 movie Civil War
- Wii Fit, a 2007 fitness video game
  - Wii Fit video game series
- Warframe, a 2013 shooter video game

== Businesses and organizations ==
=== United States ===
- Wake Forest University, Winston-Salem, North Carolina
- Wells Fargo, a bank
- White Fence, an East Los Angeles gang
- Working Families Party, a political party

=== Elsewhere ===
- Widerøe, a Norwegian airline (IATA:WF)
- Westfield Group, an Australian owner of shopping centres; 1960–2014
- Women Forward, a South African political party

== Places ==
- WF postcode area, north-east England
- Wolfenbüttel (district), Lower Saxony, Germany (vehicle plate:WF)
- Wallis and Futuna, a French overseas collectivity (ISO 3166:WF)
- Wichita Falls, Texas, United States

== Science and technology ==
- .wf, Wallis and Futuna's top-level Internet domain
- Wave function, in quantum physics
- Web framework, any software framework to develop websites
- Windows Workflow Foundation, a software component of .NET
- Work function, in solid-state physics
- Workflow, in business
- Grumman E-1 Tracer, a 1956 aircraft (US Navy designation:WF)

== Other uses ==
- William Francis (disambiguation), several people with the name
- Wing Forward, an association football position
