= SA-500F =

Test model of the Saturn V rocket

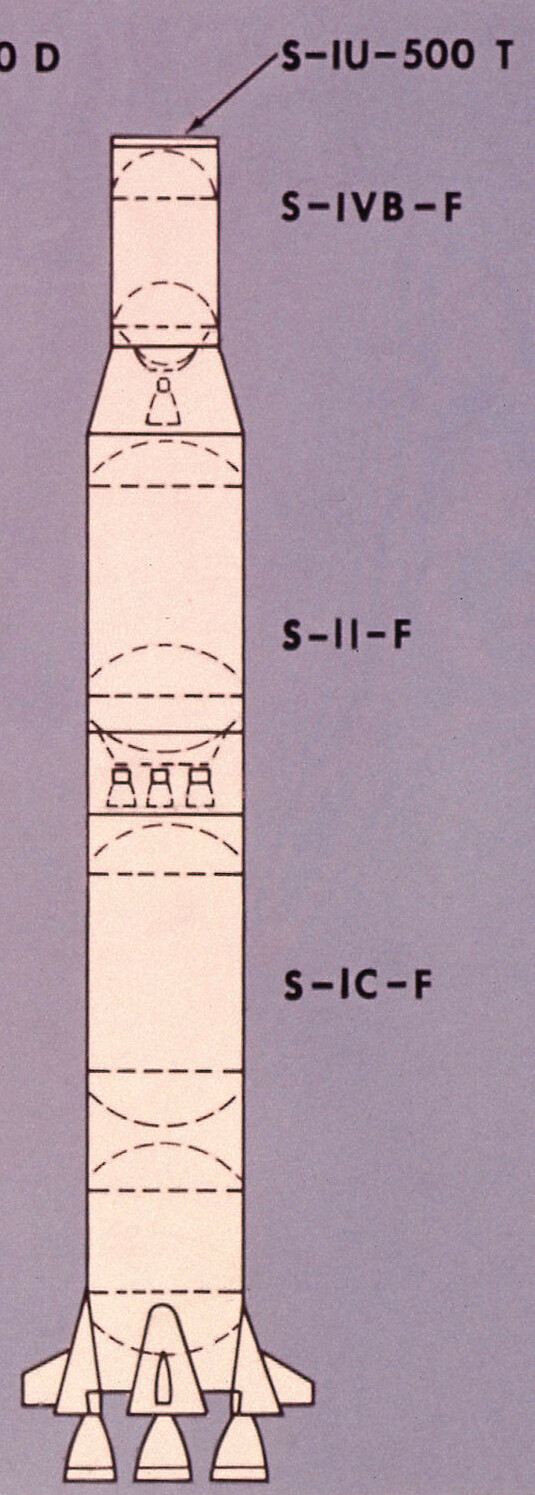
Saturn V Vehicle Configuration (SA-500-F)

SA-500F (alternately SA500F, 500F, or Facilities Integration Vehicle) was a Saturn V test model used by NASA to test facilities at Launch Complex 39 at the Kennedy Space Center on Merritt Island, Florida throughout 1966. Tests included the mating of the Saturn's stages in the Vehicle Assembly Building (VAB), the fit of the service platforms, the launcher-transporter operation, the propellant loading system, and the test connections to the mobile launcher and support equipment.

Its three stages duplicated the flight configuration, ordnance, and umbilical connections of their live counterparts. Although inert, the retrograde rockets, ullage rockets, and shaped charges had the dimensions of the live ordnance to let the launch team practice ordnance installation. The first stage only had one real F-1 engine, and the inter-tank section of the first stage had a different paint scheme than flight vehicles. The third stage had a paint scheme partially matching the Saturn 1B, for which it was originally made.

== Testing and outcomes ==
During its time as a test vehicle, SA-500F underwent several unique and critical evaluations to validate the facilities and procedures for the Saturn V program.

SA-500F was first stacked on Mobile Launcher 1 in the Vehicle Assembly Building High Bay 1 up to the Instrument Unit on March 30, 1966. The Apollo Command/Service Module facilities verification boilerplate was added on May 2, 1966.

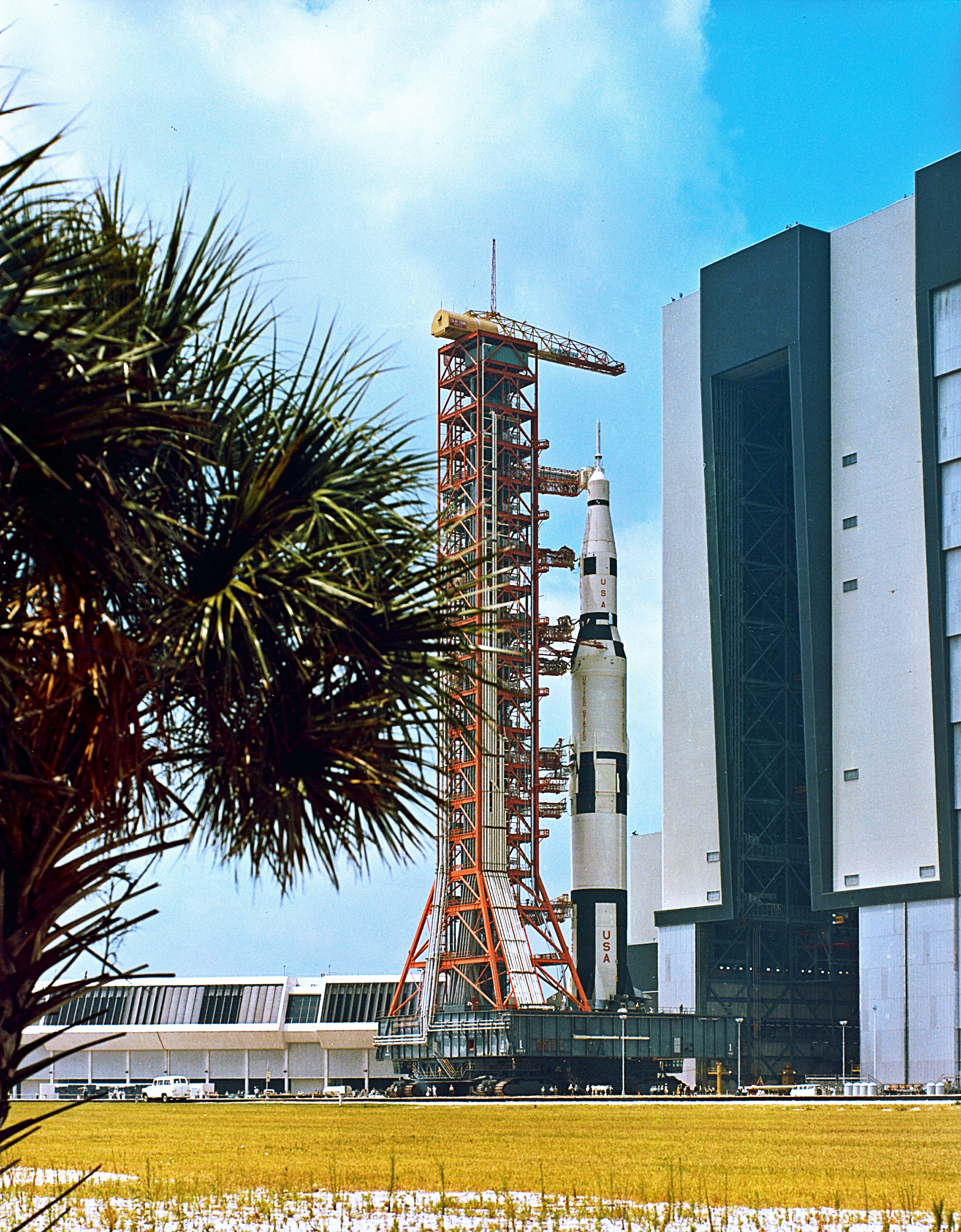
The 500F rolls out from the VAB on May 25, 1966.

500F was rolled out to Pad A on May 25, 1966. On June 8, it was rolled back to the VAB temporarily as Hurricane Alma passed, though the ground crew supposed the rollback was more of an exercise than necessity because winds remained below critical for the entire storm. 500F returned to Pad A on June 10. Facility checkout culminated with a "wet test" (Filling the tanks with propellant) to verify storage and transfer of propellants.

500F was removed from Pad A on October 14 and destacked on October 21, 1966.

=== Stability testing ===
One notable test involved assessing the structural stability of the fully assembled rocket. Engineers manually rocked the Saturn V while it was stacked in the Vehicle Assembly Building (VAB), using ropes and their feet to simulate swaying motions. This unconventional method helped determine the vehicle's response to lateral forces and ensured the platform's stability during actual operations.

NASA engineers shook the Saturn V Facilities Checkout article by human effort to ensure its ability to withstand oscillations that might be induced by wind while it was at the launchpad.

=== Propellant loading incident ===
On August 19, 1966, during a propellant loading test, a liquid oxygen (LOX) feed line ruptured, resulting in the loss of approximately 800,000 gallons of LOX. The rupture caused the inner shell of the LOX storage tank to collapse inward by 16 feet. The tank's shape was restored after re-pressurization, and the incident led to improved procedures for handling and transferring cryogenic propellants, ensuring safer operations in future launches.

=== Consideration for testing at Pad 39B ===
Following the successful completion of tests at Launch Complex 39A, there were tentative plans to reassemble SA-500F for similar facilities validation at Launch Complex 39B in the summer of 1967. However, these plans were never executed, as the objectives had already been achieved at Pad 39A, and program resources were redirected to other priorities in the Apollo schedule.

These testing activities and their outcomes demonstrated the value of SA-500F as a non-flight facilities integration vehicle. The lessons learned contributed directly to the success of later Saturn V launches and the Apollo program as a whole.

== Paint scheme ==
SA-500F was the first complete assembly of something resembling a Saturn V, and model makers quickly patterned their designs after its paint scheme, but engineers changed the black stripe to white in the intertank section of the first stage for flight vehicles after discovering the intertank got too hot from the heat of the Sun. The third stage's paint scheme is similar to that of the Saturn IB, with some minor differences, since it was originally made for testing the facilities of the Saturn IB. Model manufacturers largely have not updated their paint schemes since. The SA-500D test article also had a similar paint scheme.

== Fate ==
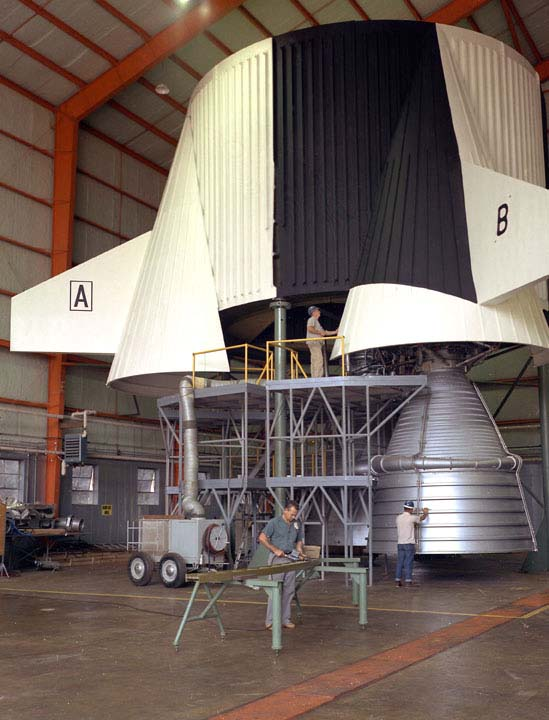
S-IC-F stage in August 1963

The first stage, S-IC-F, was returned to the Marshall Space Flight Center and was stored there for an extended time (possibly for a few years). The stage was eventually scrapped to make more room.

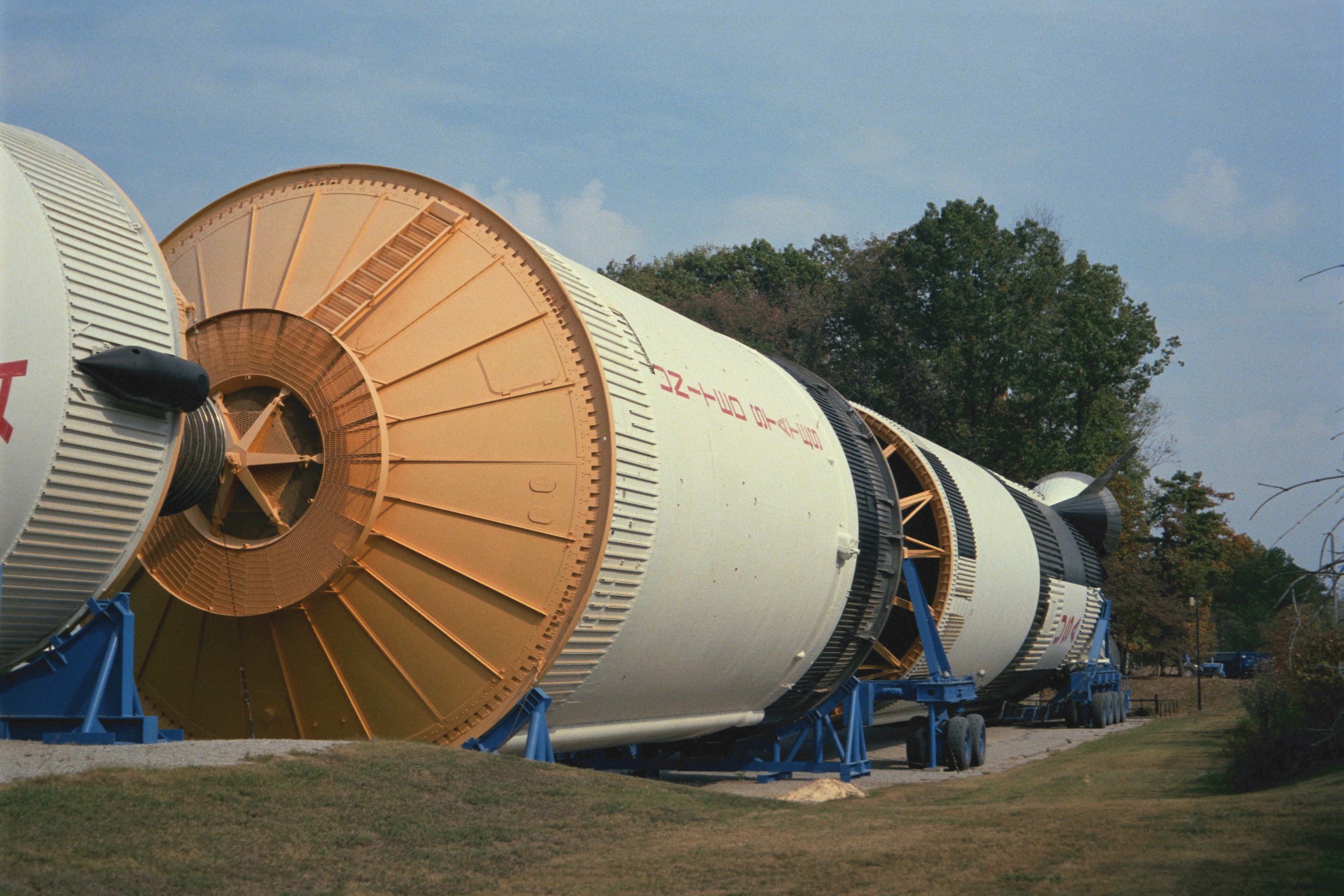
S-II-F, the second stage of SA-500F was modified to SA-500F/D and used for dynamic testing as well. It is on display (now indoors) at the U.S. Space & Rocket Center.

The second stage, S-II-F, was reassigned as a dynamic test stage at Marshall in early 1967 as S-II-F/D for use in the dynamic test vehicle SA-500D, after its predecessor was destroyed in an accident on a test stand. It is now displayed as part of the Saturn V at the U.S. Space & Rocket Center.

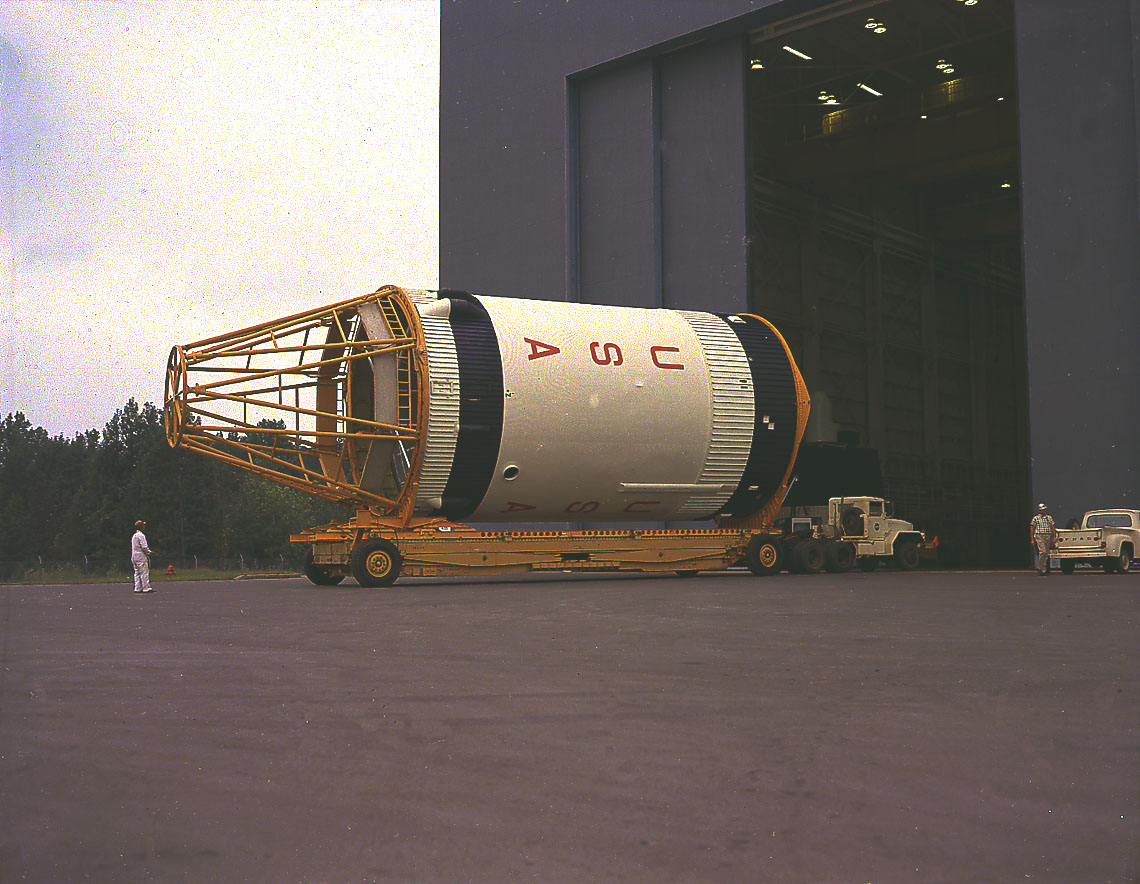
S-IVB-500F in September 1967, being modified into the Skylab Orbital Workshop

The third stage, S-IVB-500F, was originally manufactured as a dummy second stage for the smaller Saturn IB and was used to fit-check the two Saturn IB launch complex facilities (LC 34 and LC 37). It was then modified to meet the Saturn V third stage configuration for use on the SA-500F. In 1970, it was modified into the Skylab Workshop Dynamic Test Stage and was shipped in December to the Johnson Space Center for dynamic testing. In June 1971, it was shipped to Marshall for Skylab workshop static testing; and in June 1974 it was returned to KSC. It was scrapped in the 1980s or 1990s, with a possible sighting in 1986.

== See also ==
- SA-500D, the Saturn V Dynamic Test Vehicle
