= FUW =

FUW may refer to:

- Farmers' Union of Wales
- Federation of University Women
- "F.U.W.", a 2016 music video by Jussie Smollett

== See also ==
- FWV
- FUVV
- FVV (disambiguation)
- FVU (disambiguation)
- FUV (disambiguation)
- Fuu (disambiguation)
- FWU (disambiguation)
