= FUV =

FUV may refer to:

== Vehicular ==
- Arcimoto (NASDAQ stock symbol: FUV), American electric vehicle company
- Arcimoto FUV, a 4-wheeled all-electric autocycle
- Arcimoto Fun Utility Vehicle, a class of vehicles built by Arcimoto
- Ferrari Ferrari Utility Vehicle, a class of vehicle built by Ferrari, represented by the Ferrari Purosangue

== Other uses ==
- Nigerian Fulfulde (ISO 639 language code: fuv), a dialect of the Fula language
- Far ultraviolet, a class of electromagnetic radiation, a type of ultraviolet light
- Fulbright University Vietnam, Phú Mỹ Hưng, Ho Chi Minh City, Vietnam; a private non-profit university

== See also ==
- CFUV, callsign FUV in region C; Victoria, B.C., Canada radio station
- WFUV, callsign FUV in region W; New York City radio station identifying as the FUV
- FW (disambiguation)
- Fuu (disambiguation)
- FVV (disambiguation)
- FVU (disambiguation)
