= Cook Partisan Voting Index =

Political statistical index

Map of 2020–2024 Cook PVI for all voting entities in the 2028 United States presidential election (states, federal district, congressional districts of Maine and Nebraska) Map legend: State or district has a Cook PVI of D+10 or greater State or district has a Cook PVI between D+5 and D+10 State or district has a Cook PVI between D+2 and D+5 State or district has a Cook PVI between EVEN and D+2 State or district has a Cook PVI between EVEN and R+2 State or district has a Cook PVI between R+2 and R+5 State or district has a Cook PVI between R+5 and R+10 State or district has a Cook PVI of R+10 or greater

The Cook Partisan Voting Index, abbreviated PVI or CPVI, is a measurement of the partisanship of a U.S. congressional district or U.S. state. This partisanship is indicated as lean towards either the Republican Party or the Democratic Party, compared to the nation as a whole, based on how that district or state voted in the previous two presidential elections.

== History ==
The Partisan Voting Index was developed in 1997 by Charlie Cook of The Cook Political Report, in conjunction with Clark Bensen and his political statistical analysis firm, Polidata, "as a means of providing a more accurate picture of the competitiveness". It is based on the methodology introduced by Rob Richie of the Center for Voting and Democracy for the Center's July 1997 Monopoly Politics report.

The Cook Political Report has since released new PVI scores every two years. In 2021, the newsletter ended its relationship with Polidata and instead used Dave Leip's Atlas of U.S. Presidential Elections to calculate 2020's results. The most recent iteration is the 2026 Cook Partisan Voting Index.

== Calculation and format ==
The index looks at how every congressional district voted in the past two presidential elections combined and compares it to the national average. The Cook PVI is displayed as a letter, a plus sign, and a number, with the letter (either a D for Democratic or an R for Republican) indicating the party that outperformed in the district and the number showing how many percentage points above the national average it received. This means that if the calculated national averages over the prior 2 elections are D% Democrat and R% Republican, and a state differed from those averages by X percentage points, the Cook PVI will be L+X, where L is the party that the state biased towards, rather than against. For example, with a national popular vote of 51% Democratic to 49% Republican, a state with a vote of 48% Democratic to 52% Republican differed from the national average by 6 percentage points, and the Cook PVI for that state would be presented as R+6. The sole exception is that PVI is never presented as +0; when a locale would have a PVI of +0, its PVI is presented as "EVEN", in all capitals.

In 2022, the formula was updated from weighing the past 2 election cycles equally to weighing the most recent presidential election 3 times as heavily as the prior election (a ratio of 3:1, or equivalently, 75% to 25%).

== By congressional district ==
The PVIs for congressional districts are calculated based on the 2020 and 2024 presidential elections. With a PVI of R+2, Wisconsin's 1st congressional district was determined to be the median congressional district, meaning that exactly 217 districts are more Democratic and exactly 217 are more Republican than this district. As of September 2026, 224 districts are more Republican than the national average, 204 districts are more Democratic than the national average, and 7 districts match the national average. The number of swing seats, defined as those between D+5 and R+5, is 89.

Table of House districts by PVI score
District	PVI	Party of representative
Alabama 1	R+17	Republican
Alabama 2	R+7	Democratic
Alabama 3	R+23	Republican
Alabama 4	R+33	Republican
Alabama 5	R+15	Republican
Alabama 6	R+17	Republican
Alabama 7	D+10	Democratic
Alaska at-large	R+6	Republican
Arizona 1	R+1	Republican
Arizona 2	R+7	Republican
Arizona 3	D+22	Democratic
Arizona 4	D+4	Democratic
Arizona 5	R+10	Republican
Arizona 6	EVEN	Republican
Arizona 7	D+13	Democratic
Arizona 8	R+8	Republican
Arizona 9	R+15	Republican
Arkansas 1	R+23	Republican
Arkansas 2	R+8	Republican
Arkansas 3	R+13	Republican
Arkansas 4	R+20	Republican
California 1	D+7	Republican
California 2	D+13	Democratic
California 3	D+6	Independent
California 4	D+8	Democratic
California 5	R+10	Republican
California 6	D+5	Democratic
California 7	D+7	Democratic
California 8	D+19	Democratic
California 9	D+8	Democratic
California 10	D+18	Democratic
California 11	D+36	Democratic
California 12	D+39	Democratic
California 13	D+2	Democratic
California 14	D+19	Democratic
California 15	D+26	Democratic
California 16	D+25	Democratic
California 17	D+21	Democratic
California 18	D+16	Democratic
California 19	D+18	Democratic
California 20	R+16	Republican
California 21	D+5	Democratic
California 22	D+1	Republican
California 23	R+9	Republican
California 24	D+13	Democratic
California 25	D+4	Democratic
California 26	D+9	Democratic
California 27	D+6	Democratic
California 28	D+14	Democratic
California 29	D+19	Democratic
California 30	D+21	Democratic
California 31	D+8	Democratic
California 32	D+14	Democratic
California 33	D+7	Democratic
California 34	D+28	Democratic
California 35	D+6	Democratic
California 36	D+21	Democratic
California 37	D+33	Democratic
California 38	D+8	Democratic
California 39	D+7	Democratic
California 40	R+6	Republican
California 41	D+9	Republican
California 42	D+8	Democratic
California 43	D+27	Democratic
California 44	D+20	Democratic
California 45	D+3	Democratic
California 46	D+10	Democratic
California 47	D+6	Democratic
California 48	D+2	Republican
California 49	D+7	Democratic
California 50	D+10	Democratic
California 51	D+10	Democratic
California 52	D+11	Democratic
Colorado 1	D+29	Democratic
Colorado 2	D+20	Democratic
Colorado 3	R+5	Republican
Colorado 4	R+9	Republican
Colorado 5	R+5	Republican
Colorado 6	D+11	Democratic
Colorado 7	D+8	Democratic
Colorado 8	EVEN	Republican
Connecticut 1	D+12	Democratic
Connecticut 2	D+4	Democratic
Connecticut 3	D+8	Democratic
Connecticut 4	D+13	Democratic
Connecticut 5	D+3	Democratic
Delaware at-large	D+8	Democratic
Florida 1	R+18	Republican
Florida 2	R+8	Republican
Florida 3	R+10	Republican
Florida 4	R+5	Republican
Florida 5	R+10	Republican
Florida 6	R+14	Republican
Florida 7	R+5	Republican
Florida 8	R+8	Republican
Florida 9	R+8	Democratic
Florida 10	D+13	Democratic
Florida 11	R+7	Republican
Florida 12	R+7	Republican
Florida 13	R+6	Republican
Florida 14	R+4	Democratic
Florida 15	R+9	Republican
Florida 16	R+6	Republican
Florida 17	R+10	Republican
Florida 18	R+8	Republican
Florida 19	R+14	Republican
Florida 20	D+20	Democratic
Florida 21	R+7	Republican
Florida 22	R+4	Democratic
Florida 23	D+9	Democratic
Florida 24	D+22	Democratic
Florida 25	R+3	Democratic
Florida 26	R+7	Republican
Florida 27	R+6	Republican
Florida 28	R+10	Republican
Georgia 1	R+8	Republican
Georgia 2	D+4	Democratic
Georgia 3	R+15	Republican
Georgia 4	D+27	Democratic
Georgia 5	D+36	Democratic
Georgia 6	D+25	Democratic
Georgia 7	R+11	Republican
Georgia 8	R+15	Republican
Georgia 9	R+17	Republican
Georgia 10	R+11	Republican
Georgia 11	R+12	Republican
Georgia 12	R+7	Republican
Georgia 13	D+21	Democratic
Georgia 14	R+19	Republican
Hawaii 1	D+13	Democratic
Hawaii 2	D+12	Democratic
Idaho 1	R+22	Republican
Idaho 2	R+13	Republican
Illinois 1	D+18	Democratic
Illinois 2	D+18	Democratic
Illinois 3	D+17	Democratic
Illinois 4	D+17	Democratic
Illinois 5	D+19	Democratic
Illinois 6	D+3	Democratic
Illinois 7	D+34	Democratic
Illinois 8	D+5	Democratic
Illinois 9	D+19	Democratic
Illinois 10	D+12	Democratic
Illinois 11	D+6	Democratic
Illinois 12	R+22	Republican
Illinois 13	D+5	Democratic
Illinois 14	D+3	Democratic
Illinois 15	R+20	Republican
Illinois 16	R+11	Republican
Illinois 17	D+3	Democratic
Indiana 1	D+1	Democratic
Indiana 2	R+13	Republican
Indiana 3	R+16	Republican
Indiana 4	R+15	Republican
Indiana 5	R+8	Republican
Indiana 6	R+16	Republican
Indiana 7	D+21	Democratic
Indiana 8	R+18	Republican
Indiana 9	R+15	Republican
Iowa 1	R+4	Republican
Iowa 2	R+4	Republican
Iowa 3	R+2	Republican
Iowa 4	R+15	Republican
Kansas 1	R+16	Republican
Kansas 2	R+10	Republican
Kansas 3	D+2	Democratic
Kansas 4	R+12	Republican
Kentucky 1	R+23	Republican
Kentucky 2	R+20	Republican
Kentucky 3	D+10	Democratic
Kentucky 4	R+18	Republican
Kentucky 5	R+32	Republican
Kentucky 6	R+7	Republican
Louisiana 1	R+20	Republican
Louisiana 2	D+25	Democratic
Louisiana 3	R+18	Republican
Louisiana 4	R+17	Republican
Louisiana 5	R+17	Republican
Louisiana 6	R+16	Democratic
Maine 1	D+11	Democratic
Maine 2	R+4	Democratic
Maryland 1	R+8	Republican
Maryland 2	D+10	Democratic
Maryland 3	D+12	Democratic
Maryland 4	D+39	Democratic
Maryland 5	D+17	Democratic
Maryland 6	D+3	Democratic
Maryland 7	D+31	Democratic
Maryland 8	D+30	Democratic
Massachusetts 1	D+8	Democratic
Massachusetts 2	D+13	Democratic
Massachusetts 3	D+11	Democratic
Massachusetts 4	D+11	Democratic
Massachusetts 5	D+24	Democratic
Massachusetts 6	D+11	Democratic
Massachusetts 7	D+34	Democratic
Massachusetts 8	D+15	Democratic
Massachusetts 9	D+6	Democratic
Michigan 1	R+11	Republican
Michigan 2	R+15	Republican
Michigan 3	D+4	Democratic
Michigan 4	R+3	Republican
Michigan 5	R+13	Republican
Michigan 6	D+12	Democratic
Michigan 7	EVEN	Republican
Michigan 8	R+1	Democratic
Michigan 9	R+16	Republican
Michigan 10	R+3	Republican
Michigan 11	D+9	Democratic
Michigan 12	D+21	Democratic
Michigan 13	D+22	Democratic
Minnesota 1	R+6	Republican
Minnesota 2	D+3	Democratic
Minnesota 3	D+11	Democratic
Minnesota 4	D+18	Democratic
Minnesota 5	D+32	Democratic
Minnesota 6	R+10	Republican
Minnesota 7	R+18	Republican
Minnesota 8	R+7	Republican
Mississippi 1	R+18	Republican
Mississippi 2	D+11	Democratic
Mississippi 3	R+14	Republican
Mississippi 4	R+21	Republican
Missouri 1	D+29	Democratic
Missouri 2	R+4	Republican
Missouri 3	R+13	Republican
Missouri 4	R+21	Republican
Missouri 5	D+12	Democratic
Missouri 6	R+19	Republican
Missouri 7	R+21	Republican
Missouri 8	R+27	Republican
Montana 1	R+5	Republican
Montana 2	R+15	Republican
Nebraska 1	R+6	Republican
Nebraska 2	D+3	Republican
Nebraska 3	R+27	Republican
Nevada 1	D+2	Democratic
Nevada 2	R+7	Republican
Nevada 3	D+1	Democratic
Nevada 4	D+2	Democratic
New Hampshire 1	D+2	Democratic
New Hampshire 2	D+2	Democratic
New Jersey 1	D+10	Democratic
New Jersey 2	R+5	Republican
New Jersey 3	D+5	Democratic
New Jersey 4	R+14	Republican
New Jersey 5	D+2	Democratic
New Jersey 6	D+5	Democratic
New Jersey 7	EVEN	Republican
New Jersey 8	D+15	Democratic
New Jersey 9	D+2	Democratic
New Jersey 10	D+27	Democratic
New Jersey 11	D+5	Democratic
New Jersey 12	D+13	Democratic
New Mexico 1	D+7	Democratic
New Mexico 2	EVEN	Democratic
New Mexico 3	D+3	Democratic
New York 1	R+4	Republican
New York 2	R+6	Republican
New York 3	EVEN	Democratic
New York 4	D+2	Democratic
New York 5	D+24	Democratic
New York 6	D+6	Democratic
New York 7	D+25	Democratic
New York 8	D+24	Democratic
New York 9	D+22	Democratic
New York 10	D+32	Democratic
New York 11	R+10	Republican
New York 12	D+33	Democratic
New York 13	D+32	Democratic
New York 14	D+19	Democratic
New York 15	D+27	Democratic
New York 16	D+18	Democratic
New York 17	D+1	Republican
New York 18	D+2	Democratic
New York 19	D+1	Democratic
New York 20	D+8	Democratic
New York 21	R+10	Republican
New York 22	D+4	Democratic
New York 23	R+10	Republican
New York 24	R+11	Republican
New York 25	D+10	Democratic
New York 26	D+11	Democratic
North Carolina 1	R+5	Democratic
North Carolina 2	D+17	Democratic
North Carolina 3	R+6	Republican
North Carolina 4	D+23	Democratic
North Carolina 5	R+9	Republican
North Carolina 6	R+9	Republican
North Carolina 7	R+7	Republican
North Carolina 8	R+10	Republican
North Carolina 9	R+8	Republican
North Carolina 10	R+9	Republican
North Carolina 11	R+5	Republican
North Carolina 12	D+24	Democratic
North Carolina 13	R+8	Republican
North Carolina 14	R+8	Republican
North Dakota at-large	R+18	Republican
Ohio 1	R+1	Democratic
Ohio 2	R+21	Republican
Ohio 3	D+21	Democratic
Ohio 4	R+21	Republican
Ohio 5	R+12	Republican
Ohio 6	R+17	Republican
Ohio 7	R+5	Republican
Ohio 8	R+8	Republican
Ohio 9	R+5	Democratic
Ohio 10	R+4	Republican
Ohio 11	D+28	Democratic
Ohio 12	R+15	Republican
Ohio 13	D+2	Democratic
Ohio 14	R+10	Republican
Ohio 15	R+5	Republican
Oklahoma 1	R+11	Republican
Oklahoma 2	R+28	Republican
Oklahoma 3	R+23	Republican
Oklahoma 4	R+17	Republican
Oklahoma 5	R+9	Republican
Oregon 1	D+20	Democratic
Oregon 2	R+14	Republican
Oregon 3	D+24	Democratic
Oregon 4	D+6	Democratic
Oregon 5	D+4	Democratic
Oregon 6	D+6	Democratic
Pennsylvania 1	D+1	Republican
Pennsylvania 2	D+19	Democratic
Pennsylvania 3	D+40	Democratic
Pennsylvania 4	D+8	Democratic
Pennsylvania 5	D+15	Democratic
Pennsylvania 6	D+6	Democratic
Pennsylvania 7	R+1	Republican
Pennsylvania 8	R+4	Republican
Pennsylvania 9	R+19	Republican
Pennsylvania 10	R+3	Republican
Pennsylvania 11	R+11	Republican
Pennsylvania 12	D+10	Democratic
Pennsylvania 13	R+23	Republican
Pennsylvania 14	R+17	Republican
Pennsylvania 15	R+19	Republican
Pennsylvania 16	R+11	Republican
Pennsylvania 17	D+3	Democratic
Rhode Island 1	D+12	Democratic
Rhode Island 2	D+4	Democratic
South Carolina 1	R+6	Republican
South Carolina 2	R+7	Republican
South Carolina 3	R+21	Republican
South Carolina 4	R+11	Republican
South Carolina 5	R+11	Republican
South Carolina 6	D+13	Democratic
South Carolina 7	R+12	Republican
South Dakota at-large	R+15	Republican
Tennessee 1	R+29	Republican
Tennessee 2	R+17	Republican
Tennessee 3	R+18	Republican
Tennessee 4	R+11	Republican
Tennessee 5	R+10	Republican
Tennessee 6	R+13	Republican
Tennessee 7	R+11	Republican
Tennessee 8	R+10	Republican
Tennessee 9	R+9	Democratic
Texas 1	R+24	Republican
Texas 2	R+11	Republican
Texas 3	R+11	Republican
Texas 4	R+12	Republican
Texas 5	R+10	Republican
Texas 6	R+11	Republican
Texas 7	D+13	Democratic
Texas 8	R+13	Republican
Texas 9	R+9	Democratic
Texas 10	R+10	Republican
Texas 11	R+17	Republican
Texas 12	R+11	Republican
Texas 13	R+23	Republican
Texas 14	R+12	Republican
Texas 15	R+7	Republican
Texas 16	D+11	Democratic
Texas 17	R+10	Republican
Texas 18	D+29	Democratic
Texas 19	R+25	Republican
Texas 20	D+16	Democratic
Texas 21	R+10	Republican
Texas 22	R+11	Republican
Texas 23	R+7	Republican
Texas 24	R+8	Republican
Texas 25	R+11	Republican
Texas 26	R+11	Republican
Texas 27	R+10	Republican
Texas 28	R+3	Democratic
Texas 29	D+17	Democratic
Texas 30	D+25	Democratic
Texas 31	R+11	Republican
Texas 32	R+8	Democratic
Texas 33	D+18	Democratic
Texas 34	R+3	Democratic
Texas 35	R+4	Democratic
Texas 36	R+12	Republican
Texas 37	D+30	Democratic
Texas 38	R+10	Republican
Utah 1	D+12	Republican
Utah 2	R+15	Republican
Utah 3	R+21	Republican
Utah 4	R+17	Republican
Vermont at-large	D+17	Democratic
Virginia 1	R+3	Republican
Virginia 2	EVEN	Republican
Virginia 3	D+18	Democratic
Virginia 4	D+17	Democratic
Virginia 5	R+6	Republican
Virginia 6	R+12	Republican
Virginia 7	D+2	Democratic
Virginia 8	D+26	Democratic
Virginia 9	R+22	Republican
Virginia 10	D+6	Democratic
Virginia 11	D+18	Democratic
Washington 1	D+15	Democratic
Washington 2	D+12	Democratic
Washington 3	R+2	Democratic
Washington 4	R+10	Republican
Washington 5	R+5	Republican
Washington 6	D+10	Democratic
Washington 7	D+39	Democratic
Washington 8	D+3	Democratic
Washington 9	D+22	Democratic
Washington 10	D+9	Democratic
West Virginia 1	R+22	Republican
West Virginia 2	R+20	Republican
Wisconsin 1	R+2	Republican
Wisconsin 2	D+21	Democratic
Wisconsin 3	R+3	Republican
Wisconsin 4	D+26	Democratic
Wisconsin 5	R+11	Republican
Wisconsin 6	R+8	Republican
Wisconsin 7	R+11	Republican
Wisconsin 8	R+8	Republican
Wyoming at-large	R+23	Republican

== By state ==
The PVIs for states are calculated based on the results of the U.S. presidential elections in 2020 and 2024. The table below reflects the state of Congress and governors, based on the 2024 election results.

Using the United States Census Bureau's official 2024 population estimates, a combined 182,737,780 residents live in the 29 states that lean Republican, 141,264,067 residents live in the 20 voting blocs (19 states plus Washington, D.C.) that lean Democratic, and 16,101,434 residents live in the two states (Michigan and Wisconsin) that lean neither Republican nor Democratic (PVI of EVEN).

Bloc	PVI	Last presidential election winner	Party of governor	Party in Senate	House balance
Alabama	R+15	Republican	Republican	Republican	5R, 2D
Alaska	R+6	Republican	Republican	Republican	1R
Arizona	R+2	Republican	Democratic	Democratic	6R, 3D
Arkansas	R+15	Republican	Republican	Republican	4R
California	D+12	Democratic	Democratic	Democratic	43D, 9R
Colorado	D+6	Democratic	Democratic	Democratic	4D, 4R
Connecticut	D+8	Democratic	Democratic	Democratic	5D
Delaware	D+8	Democratic	Democratic	Democratic	1D
Florida	R+5	Republican	Republican	Republican	20R, 8D
Georgia	R+1	Republican	Republican	Democratic	9R, 5D
Hawaii	D+13	Democratic	Democratic	Democratic	2D
Idaho	R+18	Republican	Republican	Republican	2R
Illinois	D+6	Democratic	Democratic	Democratic	14D, 3R
Indiana	R+9	Republican	Republican	Republican	7R, 2D
Iowa	R+6	Republican	Republican	Republican	4R
Kansas	R+8	Republican	Democratic	Republican	3R, 1D
Kentucky	R+15	Republican	Democratic	Republican	5R, 1D
Louisiana	R+11	Republican	Republican	Republican	4R, 2D
Maine	D+4	Democratic	Democratic	Both (Note: Includes an independent senator who caucuses with the Democrats)	2D
Maryland	D+15	Democratic	Democratic	Democratic	7D, 1R
Massachusetts	D+14	Democratic	Democratic	Democratic	9D
Michigan	EVEN	Republican	Democratic	Democratic	7R, 6D
Minnesota	D+3	Democratic	Democratic	Democratic	4D, 4R
Mississippi	R+11	Republican	Republican	Republican	3R, 1D
Missouri	R+9	Republican	Republican	Republican	6R, 2D
Montana	R+10	Republican	Republican	Republican	2R
Nebraska	R+10	Republican	Republican	Republican	3R
Nevada	R+1	Republican	Republican	Democratic	3D, 1R
New Hampshire	D+2	Democratic	Republican	Democratic	2D
New Jersey	D+4	Democratic	Democratic	Democratic	9D, 3R
New Mexico	D+4	Democratic	Democratic	Democratic	3D
New York	D+8	Democratic	Democratic	Democratic	19D, 7R
North Carolina	R+1	Republican	Democratic	Republican	10R, 4D
North Dakota	R+18	Republican	Republican	Republican	1R
Ohio	R+5	Republican	Republican	Republican	10R, 5D
Oklahoma	R+17	Republican	Republican	Republican	5R
Oregon	D+8	Democratic	Democratic	Democratic	5D, 1R
Pennsylvania	R+1	Republican	Democratic	Both	10R, 7D
Rhode Island	D+8	Democratic	Democratic	Democratic	2D
South Carolina	R+8	Republican	Republican	Republican	6R, 1D
South Dakota	R+15	Republican	Republican	Republican	1R
Tennessee	R+14	Republican	Republican	Republican	8R, 1D
Texas	R+6	Republican	Republican	Republican	25R, 13D
Utah	R+11	Republican	Republican	Republican	4R
Vermont	D+17	Democratic	Republican	Democratic (Note: Includes an independent senator who caucuses with the Democrats)	1D
Virginia	D+3	Democratic	Democratic	Democratic	6D, 5R
Washington	D+10	Democratic	Democratic	Democratic	8D, 2R
Washington, D.C.	D+44	Democratic	Democratic (Note: Mayor of the District of Columbia)	N/A	1D (Note: Non-voting delegate)
West Virginia	R+21	Republican	Republican	Republican	2R
Wisconsin	EVEN	Republican	Democratic	Both	6R, 2D
Wyoming	R+23	Republican	Republican	Republican	1R

== See also ==
- Political party strength in U.S. states
- Psephology, the statistical analysis of elections
- Two-party-preferred vote
