= Steven Hill (author) =

American writer and political reformer

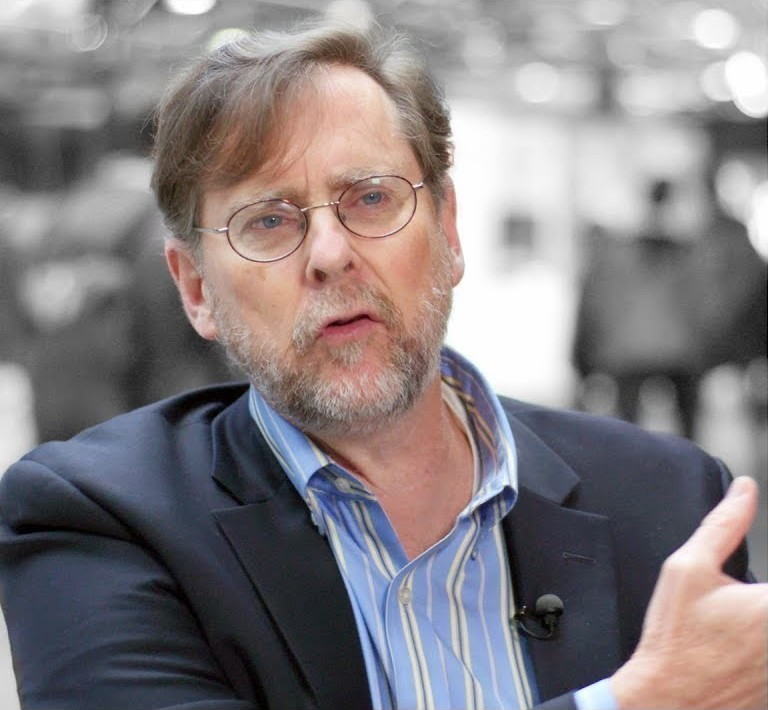
- Steven Hill
- Born: 1958; New London, Connecticut

Steven John Hill (born 6 June 1958) is an American writer, columnist and political reformer. He has authored several books on American politics and political reform, as well as a book on the European political economy (Europe's Promise: Why the European Way is the Best Hope in an Insecure Age). Hill led the campaign to pass instant runoff voting in San Francisco in 2002, which was the first victory for electoral system reform in the United States since the 1950s, and was a leader in other campaigns for instant runoff voting and public financing of campaigns. He is a cofounder of FairVote and former director of the political reform program at the New America Foundation.

== Life ==
Hill was born in New London, Connecticut and lived there until the age of four when his family relocated up the Thames River to Uncasville, a borough of Montville. He lived there until he went to college, attending Yale University, the University of Connecticut, and Western Washington University/Fairhaven College. In the early 1990s, he cofounded Citizens for Proportional Representation (CPR) along with Rob Richie and Matthew Cossolotto. CPR soon changed its name to the Center for Voting and Democracy, and Hill and Richie became its first two employees in the mid-1990s. The Center underwent another name change in the early 2000s, and now is known as FairVote.

== Work ==
Hill has been widely known in the United States for advancing the political reforms of proportional representation, instant runoff voting, public financing of campaigns, universal voter registration, national direct election of the president and reform of the U.S. Senate. He made the argument for these reforms and others in his books 10 Steps to Repair American Democracy (2006), Fixing Elections: The Failure of America's Winner Take All Politics (2003) and Reflecting All of Us/Whose Vote Counts (2001, co-authored with Rob Richie). He also advanced these political reforms by penning numerous op-eds and articles in leading American publications such as The New York Times, Wall Street Journal, Washington Post, Los Angeles Times, New York Daily News, Financial Times, The Guardian, International Herald Tribune and many others.

At the same time, Hill also wore a second hat of political reformer and campaigner. He led the campaign for instant runoff voting (IRV) in San Francisco in 2002, which was the first victory for electoral system reform in the United States since the 1950s. Hill also played a lead role in successful IRV campaigns in Oakland, Berkeley, San Leandro and elsewhere, as well as successful campaigns for public financing in San Francisco and Oakland. As director of the Political Reform Program at the New America Foundation, he led the effort to pass a landmark law in California to lower the voter registration age to 17. Hill also played a leading role in organizing a constitutional convention for California in 2009, which garnered widespread popular support but failed to qualify as a ballot initiative in 2010.

Hill began research into the political institutions and practices in Europe during trips there in the late 1990s. Initially, he studied the widespread use in Europe of proportional representation electoral systems, as well as public financing of campaigns and universal voter registration. During the course of his research, his interests broadened when he became aware of many other trans-Atlantic differences between the United States and Europe in terms of health care, social benefits and supports for families, political economy, the design of corporations/economic democracy, energy and transportation, representative government and foreign policy. Hill traveled back and forth to Europe for 10 years continuing his observations and research, and those eventually became the basis for his book Europe's Promise: Why the European Way is the Best Hope in an Insecure Age, which compares the "European way" to the "American way."

Hill's work has been widely published in the United States and abroad. He has authored articles and op-eds for publications such as the New York Times, Washington Post, Wall Street Journal, International Herald Tribune, Financial Times, The Guardian, Los Angeles Times, New York Daily News, The Nation, Salon.com, American Prospect, Le Monde Diplomatique, Hürriyet Daily News (Turkey), Prague Post, Taiwan News, Roll Call, Sierra, Ms., San Francisco Chronicle, Miami Herald, Philadelphia Inquirer, Chicago Tribune, Houston Chronicle and many other leading publications. He writes a monthly column for Social Europe Journal. Hill has lectured widely in the United States and Europe, and is a frequent source for print, radio and television journalists.

== Personal life ==
Hill currently lives in San Francisco, California with his partner Lucy Colvin, who is a psychotherapist and pianist.

== Books ==
- Reflecting All of Us/Whose Vote Counts?, Beacon Press, co-authored with Robert Richie (2001, ISBN 0807044237)
- Fixing Elections: The Failure of America's Winner Take All Politics, Routledge Press (2003, ISBN 0415931940)
- 10 Steps to Repair American Democracy, PoliPoint Press (2006, ISBN 0976062151)
- Europe's Promise: Why the European Way is the Best Hope in an Insecure Age, University of California Press (2010, ISBN 0520261372)
- Raw Deal: How the "Uber Economy" and Runaway Capitalism Are Screwing American Workers, St. Martin's Press (2015, ISBN 1250071585)
- Expand Social Security Now!: How to Ensure Americans Get the Retirement They Deserve, Beacon Press (2016, ISBN 0807028436)
