= Mark Frohnmayer =

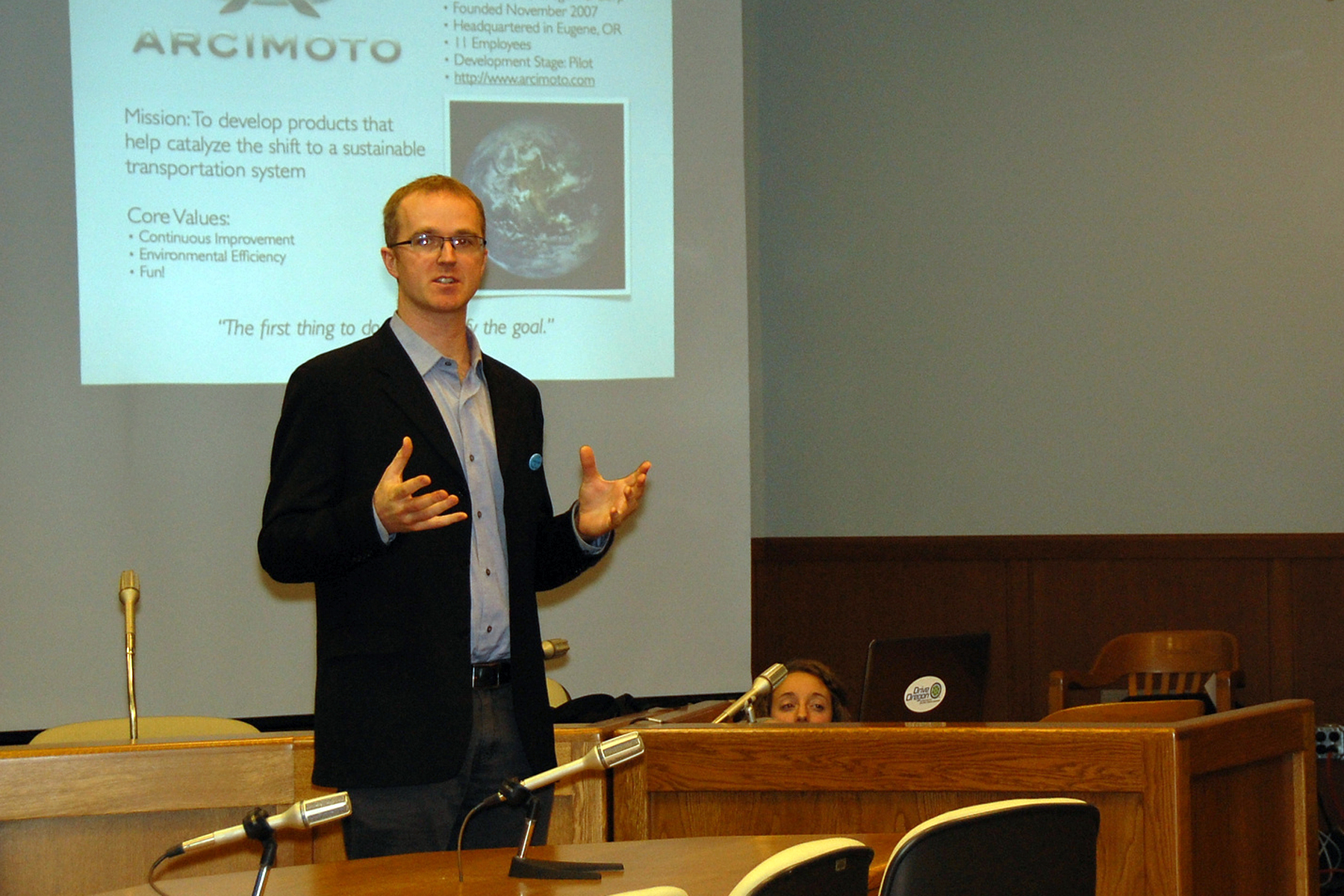
- Frohnmayer in 2013
- Occupation(s): Programmer, entrepreneur
- Notable work: Starsiege: Tribes

Mark Frohnmayer is an American software and electric vehicle entrepreneur. He was the lead programmer of Starsiege: Tribes and Tribes 2 at Dynamix before leaving to co-found GarageGames, where he helped architect the Torque Game Engine and led the development of Zap! The Game, Marble Blast Gold and Marble Blast Ultra.

He has since started Arcimoto based in Eugene, Oregon, which designs and sells a three-wheeled electric vehicle. Frohnmayer has also engaged in public policy: he served from 2011 to 2014 on the Oregon Transportation Commission. He also launched the Unified Primary effort to reform Oregon's election system, which led to the establishment of the Equal Vote Coalition. He is the son of former Oregon Attorney General Dave Frohnmayer.
