= F5U =

F5U may refer to

- 5-FU or f5U, technical name of the drug Fluorouracil
- uranium pentafluoride (F_{5}U), see Glossary of chemical formulae
- Vought XF5U "Flying Flapjack", experimental U.S. Navy fighter aircraft
- F5u, a type of German torpedo, see List of World War II torpedoes of Germany

== See also ==
- FSU (disambiguation)
- FVU (disambiguation)
- FU (disambiguation)
