= Equal Vote Coalition =

Electoral reform advocacy group

The Equal Vote Coalition
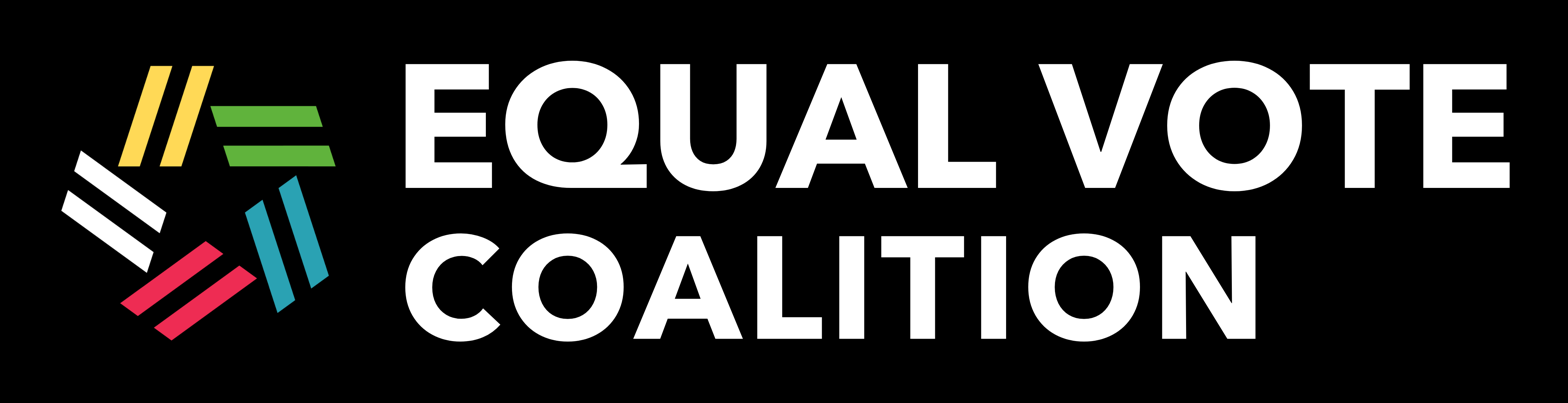
- Type: 501(c)(3) nonprofit organization
- Purpose: Promoting electoral reform in the United States
- Website: equal.vote

The Equal Vote Coalition (EVC) is a nonpartisan American electoral reform group that advocates for voting methods including STAR Voting, Approval Voting, and Condorcet voting.

The Equal Vote Coalition argues that Choose One Plurality voting is inherently unequal, leading to an outsized influence of money in politics, hyper-partisan rancor, and widespread electoral disenchantment.

The Equal Vote Coalition's work focuses on educating voters about voting rules and coalition-building in the electoral reform movement. The coalition hosts events such as webinars, monthly chapter meetings, and informational events to engage and mobilize activists.

== History ==
The Equal Vote Coalition was established in 2014 by Mark Frohnmayer following his 2014 voting reform campaign to implement the Unified Primary system in Oregon, which incorporated a nonpartisan Approval Voting primary with a top-two runoff. The Unified Primary system has since been adopted in St. Louis.

As its first event, the Equal Vote Coalition hosted an Equal Vote Conference at the University of Oregon which included leading advocates for Approval Voting, Ranked Choice Voting, Score Voting, and leaders in the Oregon voting reform movement including advocates for Oregon's Vote by Mail initiative. At the time, the reform community was very split between advocates for ordinal voting methods and cardinal voting methods, with both sides arguing that the other side's proposals were unworkable. The debate led to the idea for what is now known as the STAR Voting method, which is a hybrid of the two approaches.

In 2017, preliminary studies modeling Voter Satisfaction Efficiency from the Center For Election Science showed STAR Voting significantly outperforming both Ranked Choice and Approval Voting in both producing accurate outcomes and incentivizing honest non-strategic voting. The models also showed that a 0-5 ballot performed as well as larger scales, which led the Equal Vote Coalition to adopt the 0-5 star ballot and to name the method STAR Voting. Shortly after, the Equal Vote Coalition coalitioned with a number of other Oregon electoral reform organizations which had voted to support STAR Voting, including RCV Oregon, and the Oregon chapter of Represent.Us, and launched twin ballot initiatives to implement STAR Voting in Lane County and Multnomah County, respectively.

The Equal Vote Coalition was incorporated as a 501c3 nonprofit in 2019. by Sara Wolk, Alan Zundel, and Mark Frohnmayer. Initially focused in Oregon, the coalition has since expanded its efforts across the United States and internationally, engaging with researchers and activists to promote voting equality. In 2020 the STAR Voting Action 501c4 nonprofit was founded to focus on advocacy and campaigns for STAR Voting more specifically.

== Primary initiatives ==
=== Social choice theory ===
==== STAR voting ====
STAR (Score Then Automatic Runoff) voting is the flagship initiative of the Equal Vote Coalition. In STAR Voting, voters score candidates from 5 stars (best) to 0 stars (worst). The two highest-scoring candidates overall proceed to an automatic runoff in which each voter's vote automatically goes to the finalist that voter preferred. The finalist with the most votes wins. This method aims to eliminate vote splitting, which they argue will encourage more positive campaigning and fairer elections.

==== Other Voting Methods ====
In addition to STAR, the Equal Vote Coalition supports other voting methods that align with its core principles and that maximize its five pillars for electoral reform; Equality, Accuracy, Honesty, Expression, and Simplicity. These include Approval Voting and Condorcet's method under the name Ranked Robin (with multiple suggested tiebreakers, such as Copeland, Minimax, or plurality). The group argues these methods can help achieve a more equal and representative voting system while promoting competition. Equal Vote has also advocated for the unified primary system, which consists of an approval voting primary election followed by a top two runoff general election.

=== Voter Education and Consulting ===
The Equal Vote Coalition offers voter education and consulting services to groups and organizations interested in learning more about electoral reform or taking a position on voting reform, offering consulting, presentations, and a slate of education and voter engagement resources.

=== Election Implementation ===
The Equal Vote Coalition works with organizations interested in adopting and using recommended voting methods, offering consulting and election hosting services. STAR Voting has been adopted and used by the Multnomah County Democratic Party for all internal elections, the Democratic Party of Oregon for presidential delegate elections, and the Independent Party of Oregon for use in primary elections.

Under the STAR Elections Project, the Equal Vote Coalition offers online voting resources where users can try STAR voting, including quick and easy online polls at the star.vote website, elections using Google Forms, and elections and polls using a variety of voting methods at the BetterVoting.org website.

=== Research ===
In 2013, Equal Vote Executive Director Sara Wolk, board director Jameson Quinn, PhD, and member Marcus Ogren published a peer-reviewed paper titled "STAR Voting, Equality of Voice, and Voter Satisfaction: Considerations for Voting Reform" in the journal Constitutional Political Economy.

Marcus Ogren went on to publish another peer-reviewed paper titled "Candidate incentive distributions: How voting methods shape electoral incentives" in 2024 in the Electoral Studies journal from Elsevier.

Equal Vote Production Lead Arend Castelein in May, 2024 released a new Equal Vote webpage, RcvChangedAlaska.com, that analyzes, models, and visualizes Ranked Choice Voting elections using real world election data, including the 2022 United States House of Representatives election in Alaska. The page is interactive and allows users to determine which elections suffered from common pathologies and how these elections lived up to common talking points for Ranked Choice Voting.
