= Open Our Democracy Act =

2017 United States proposed bill

- Long title: To require all candidates for election for the office of Senator or Member of the House of Representatives to run in an open primary regardless of political party preference or lack thereof, to limit the ensuing general election for such office to the two candidates receiving the greatest number of votes in such open primary, and for other purposes.

Legislative history
- Introduced in the United States House of Representatives as H.R. 2981 by Rep. John Delaney (D-MD) on July 21st, 2017; Committee consideration by Committee on House Administration and Committee on Oversight and Government Reform on 06/21/2017; Judiciary Subcommittee on the Constitution and Civil Justice on 07/10/2017

The Open Our Democracy Act is a bill introduced in the United States House of Representatives by U.S. Representative John Delaney. The bill would establish Election Day as a federal holiday, mandate open and top-two primary elections so that all eligible voters can participate in them, and end gerrymandering by requiring independent commissions to draw the districts in each state.

== History ==
The bill has been cosponsored by House representatives John Yarmuth, Derek Kilmer, Jared Polis, and Scott Peters. The most recently documented action on it was a review by the United States House Judiciary Subcommittee on the Constitution and Civil Justice. It has not yet been voted on or gone on the House Calendar.

Delaney submitted the current version of the bill on July 21, 2017, in the 115th Congress. Delaney had previously proposed two similar bills, one in 2015 (H.R. 2655 of the 114th Congress), and another 2014 (H.R. 5334 of the 113th Congress). In both cases, the House did not bring the bill to a vote.

== See also ==
- Electoral reform in the United States
- Redistricting
- United States congressional apportionment
