= FWU (disambiguation) =

"FWU" is a 2025 song by Don Toliver.

FWU may also refer to:

- "FWU", a song by PartyNextDoor from the 2014 album PartyNextDoor Two
- Friedrich Wilhelm University
