= RepresentWomen =

American non-profit organization

- Formation: 2018
- Founder: Cynthia Richie Terrell
- Type: 501(c)(3) nonprofit organization
- Tax ID no.: 82-1933696
- Purpose: Promoting reforms to increase women's representation in political office
- Headquarters: Takoma Park, Maryland, US
- Executive Director: Cynthia Richie Terrell
- Parent organization: FairVote
- Affiliations: ReflectUS Coalition
- Staff: 11 (2023)
- Website: www.representwomen.org
- Formerly called: Representation2020

RepresentWomen is a 501(c)(3) organization that argues in favor of institutional reforms to help women achieve gender parity in public office in the United States. The organization conducts research and advocacy work to advance women's representation through candidate recruitment rules (i.e. gender quotas for political parties and political action committees), electoral reforms (i.e. ranked choice voting), and the modernization of legislative rules (i.e. onsite childcare and nursing rooms). Their mission, according to their website, is to "strengthen our democracy by advancing reforms that break down barriers to ensure more women can run, win, serve, and lead."

RepresentWomen, originally called Representation2020, started in 2013 as a project of FairVote, a nonprofit that advocates for electoral reform in the United States. The organization changed its name to RepresentWomen and achieved nonprofit status in 2018.

RepresentWomen is based in Takoma Park, Maryland.

== Research projects ==
=== The Gender Parity Index ===
RepresentWomen has put out a Gender Parity Index every year since 2014. This report scores local, state, and federal U.S. governments on the degree to which they are composed of women. Each state is given a letter grade reflecting how close they are to gender parity. Grades are based on a point system measuring the proportion of women in Congress, state legislatures, state executive positions, and local executive positions.

States receive an "A" grade if they score a 50.0 and above, a "B" if they score between 49.9 and 33.0, a "C" if they are between 32.9 and 25.0, a "D" if they are between 24.9 and 10.0, and an "F" if they score below 10.0. "A"-grade states are considered to have reached gender parity across all levels of elected government. The only state to have received an "A" grade on their index is New Hampshire.

With the majority of states ranking between a "C" and "D", the report consistently finds that "women are underrepresented at the national, state, and local level, and that parity for men and women in elected office is unlikely to occur without structural changes in recruitment, electoral, and legislative rules." The 2019 report found that women are less likely to be represented, despite the fact that "women in 2018 filed to run, became party nominees, and won against other candidates like never before."

According to the 2019 index, the 2018 "Year of the Woman" yielded record breakthroughs for women, including the largest-ever class of women in the U.S. Congress, gender-balanced state legislatures in Nevada, and new firsts for women of color, members of the LGBT community, and young people. Still, no state achieved gender parity.

=== Ranked Choice Voting ===
In 2016, RepresentWomen released a report titled "The Impact of Ranked Choice Voting on Representation" that tracked how ranked choice voting (RCV) impacted the descriptive representation of women and people of color in the California Bay Area between 2004 and 2014. In San Francisco, for example, the study found that the representation of people of color in 2016 was eight seats higher than it had been before ranked choice voting was adopted. Overall, the report found that women of color won 23% of all seats determined by ranked voting in 2016, compared with 14% before the system was adopted.

In 2020, RepresentWomen released an updated analysis that tracked the impact of ranked choice voting on the descriptive representation of women and people of color in 19 U.S. cities between 2010 and 2019. According to this report, as women won 45% of all ranked choice elections that featured three or more candidates in this frame of time. Overall, the report found that the use of ranked choice voting in U.S. cities "correlates with representation that more closely matches the demographics of America's increasingly diverse voter population."

=== International Voting Rules ===
RepresentWomen released an international report in 2018, titled, "Why Rules and Systems Matter: Lessons from Around the World". This report reviewed how different policies and systems affect women's representation in 193 countries and ranked countries based on their levels of women's representation. The research found that proportional representation voting systems and gender quotas were associated with the increased representation of women.

In 2019 and 2020, RepresentWomen produced new iterations of this report.

=== Quotas for PACs and Donors ===
In 2016, RepresentWomen partnered with OpenSecrets (CRP) and Common Cause to explore political giving to congressional candidates with a gender lens and create transparency on how political giving impacts the "viability" of candidates. This partnership terminated with the release of a report titled, "Individual and PAC Giving to Women Candidates",

In 2020, RepresentWomen released an update to this report, "The Cost of Electing Women: How PACs and Donors can Make a Difference". The 2020 report measured the impact of campaign finance in the 2018 midterm election cycle and found that political action committees tend to "hedge their bets" when it comes to funding congressional candidates.

== Advocacy ==
=== Fair Representation Act ===
RepresentWomen advocates for the implementation of proportional representation in the United States through the use of ranked choice voting and multi-member districts. They identify the Fair Representation Act (HR 4000), introduced by Rep. Donald Beyer Jr., as a way to achieve this reform to electoral systems. The Fair Representation Act emerged from talks between Representative Beyer and FairVote, an organization dedicated to electoral reform. RepresentWomen's executive director Cynthia Richie Terrell played a key role in creating the Fair Representation Act.

=== Ranked Choice Voting ===
In addition to advocating for the Fair Representation Act, which would implement single transferable vote in the United States House of Representatives, RepresentWomen participates in advocacy geared towards advancing ranked choice voting efforts in the presidential election.

== See also ==
- FairVote
- Women in government
