= The Center for Election Science =

American nonprofit organization

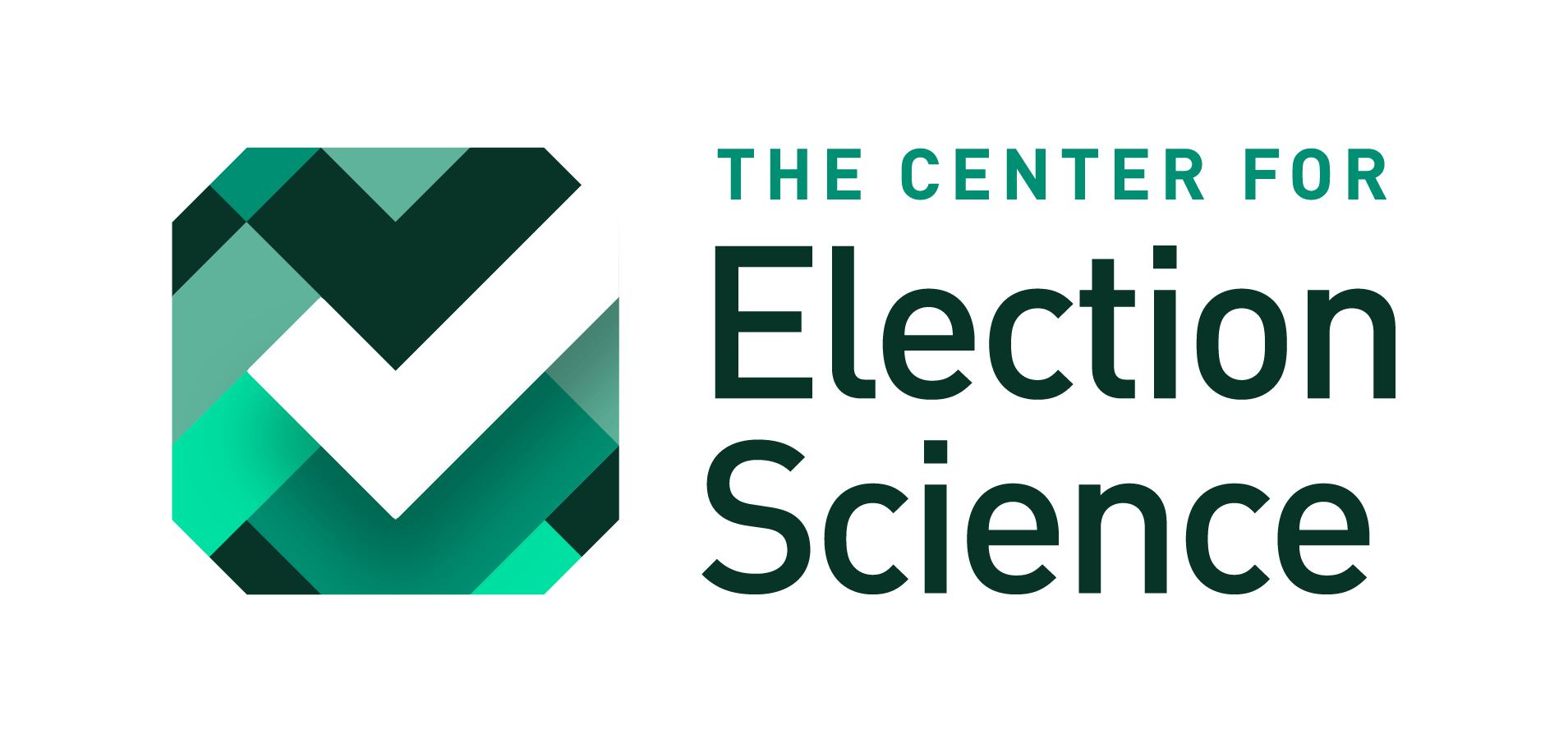
- Founders: Clay Shentrup; Aaron Hamlin; Dr. Warren D. Smith
- Type: 501(c)(3) nonprofit organization
- Headquarters: Remote/Distributed, U.S.
- Chief Executive Officer: Nina Taylor
- Board of directors: Chair; Michael Ruvinsky; Vice Chair; John Hegeman; Treasurer; LaShana Lewis, Secretary; Justine Metz; Directors; Tamika Anderson; Sara Ponzio
- Revenue: $2.1 million (2022)
- Website: electionscience.org

The Center for Election Science is an American 501(c)(3) organization that focuses on voter education and promoting election science. The organization promotes cardinal voting methods such as approval and score voting. They have their early roots in effective altruism.

The Center for Election Science helped pass approval voting in the city of Fargo, North Dakota, during the 2018 elections alongside Reform Fargo. In St. Louis, Missouri, the organization passed an approval voting law in 2020 with the help of St. Louis Approves.

== Organizational opinions ==
The Center argues that approval voting is superior to other proposed electoral reforms for multiple reasons, including accuracy, simplicity, and tractability. They say approval voting will elect more consensus winners, which it contends traditional runoffs and instant-runoff ranked methods don't allow, because they eliminate candidates with low first-preference support but broad support in general.

They further argue that the system's adherence to the favorite betrayal criterion is highly desirable, because it allows voters to safely give their true favorite maximum support without worrying that voting insincerely could give them a better overall result.

== History ==
The Center for Election Science was founded in 2011 by Clay Shentrup, Aaron Hamlin, and Warren D. Smith. It achieved status as a 501(c)3 in 2012 and began soliciting donations. The board of directors for that year consisted of:

- Aaron Hamlin - President
- Jan Kok - Vice President
- Dr. Andrew Jennings - Treasurer
- Clay Shentrup - Secretary
- Eric Sanders - Parliamentarian

They focused on building an online and in-person presence by writing articles and giving presentations to reform organizations, a notable event being Hamlin's interview with Kenneth Arrow of Arrow's impossibility theorem fame.

In December 2017 they received a grant from Open Philanthropy totaling $598,600. This funding was used to hire the director, Aaron Hamlin, to a full-time position, along with a few other staff members. The organization also used this funding to support Reform Fargo in their efforts to switch Fargo elections to approval voting.

Reform Fargo was founded by Jed Limke after serving on a voting reform task force created by the City Commission. The task force recommended the City Commission switch to approval voting, but the commission refused to put the reform on the ballot. With the assistance of The Center for Election Science, Limke and others went on to run an educational campaign about approval voting. They then collected 2,600 signatures and put approval voting up for referendum. The measure appeared on the ballot on November 6, 2018, and passed with 63.5% of the vote in favor of the change.

In February 2019, the organization received a second grant from Open Philanthropy, totaling $1.8 million. This enabled them to support STL Approves in their venture to switch St. Louis to approval voting. Election Science was just one of many organizations to endorse the effort, including Show Me Integrity and The League of Women Voters. The ballot measure put forth to switch St. Louis to approval voting, proposition D, passed on Tuesday, November 3, 2020, with 68.1% in favor.

The following year, the center awarded five grants to voting reform organizations focused on Seattle, the San Francisco Bay Area, Austin, Missouri, and Utah. The grants were intended to fund polling and legal services for potential campaigns.

Of those exploratory grants, Seattle eventually resulted in a ballot measure, championed by Seattle Approves, and an effort in Missouri is still underway. Due to the process by which ballot measures are adopted in Seattle, the city council added instant runoff voting as a direct rival. Seattle voters elected to change their voting system by a slim margin–154,424 in favor, 148,901 against–and chose instant runoff over approval.

In January 2024, the center brought on Nina Taylor as chief executive officer.

In September 2026, after several months without an executive director, the organization announced it would wind down operations and dissolve. Work will be continued by Utah Approves and the Equal Vote Coalition.

== Current efforts ==
In Maryland, CES is focused on creating a legislative and municipal pathway for reform. Legislative Momentum: CES has actively lobbied for bills like SB 913, which would grant local jurisdictions the home-rule authority to adopt approval voting for county and executive offices Utah has become a critical staging ground for live implementation.

The Senate District 11 Special Election: In late 2025, CES partnered with the Utah Forward Party to conduct a historic special election to replace State Senator Daniel Thatcher. This marked the first time in U.S. history that approval voting was used at the state-government level to select a legislative replacement.

== See also ==
- Approval Voting Party
- Forward Party (United States)
- Equal Vote Coalition
- Electoral reform in the United States
