= FairVote =

U.S. electoral reform organization

- Formation: June 1992; 34 years ago (as Citizens for Proportional Representation); Cincinnati, Ohio, U.S.
- Type: 501(c)(3) nonprofit organization
- Purpose: Promoting electoral reform in the United States
- Headquarters: Silver Spring, Maryland, U.S.
- Coordinates: 38.9942°N 77.0272°W
- Founder: Robert Richie, Steven Hill, Matthew Cossolotto
- Revenue: $4.3 million (2019)
- Staff: 32
- Website: fairvote.org
- Formerly called: The Center for Voting and Democracy, Citizens for Proportional Representation

FairVote is a 501(c)(3) organization and lobbying group in the United States. It was founded in 1992 as Citizens for Proportional Representation to support the implementation of proportional representation in American elections. Its focus changed over time to emphasize instant-runoff voting (IRV), a national popular vote, and universal voter registration. It changed its name to the Center for Voting and Democracy in 1993 and to FairVote in 2004.

== About ==
=== Founding ===
FairVote was founded as Citizens for Proportional Representation (CPR) in 1992 in Cincinnati, Ohio, as the result of a merger of several smaller groups promoting proportional representation into a single, national advocacy group. Early leaders included Robert Richie as executive director, Matthew Cossolotto as president, and Steven Hill as western regional director. John Anderson was head of its national advisory board and in 1992 published a New York Times commentary advocating for IRV in presidential elections.

Board of Directors, 2025
- Dr. Danielle Allen, Chair; Donald Marron, Vice Chair; David Wilner, Treasurer; Mark de la Iglesia, Secretary; Dr. Purnima Chawla; Tim Hayes; Jake Sandler; Chi Kim; Rhett Dornbach-Bender; Stan Lockhart

=== History and timeline ===
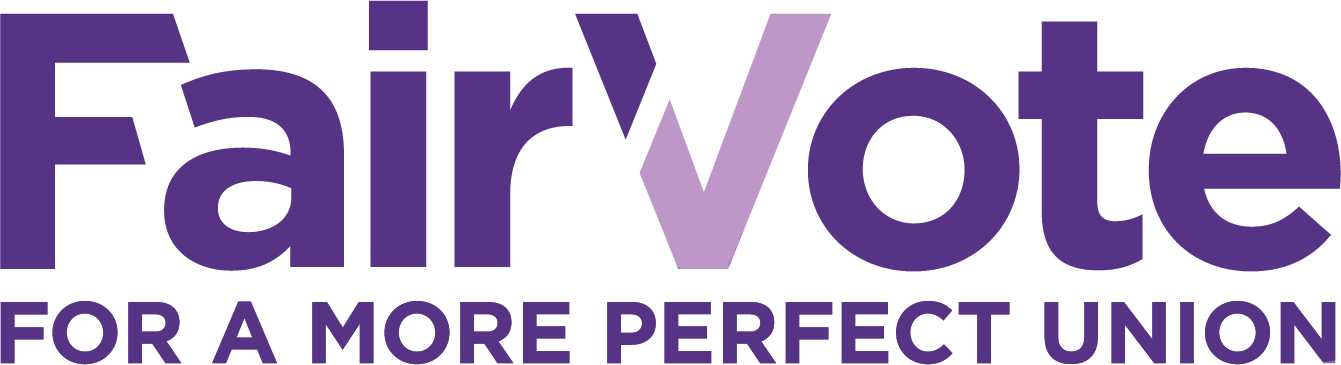
Logo used from 2016 to 2022

- 1992: CPR holds its first convention with a speech by Ted Berry, Cincinnati's first African-American mayor.
- 1993: CPR changes its name to the Center for Voting and Democracy (CVD) and relocates to Washington, D.C.
- 1994: CVD releases its first Dubious Democracy report on congressional elections.
- 1996: CVD sponsors a ballot initiative to implement proportional representation in San Francisco. The campaign fails, losing 54-46%.
- 2002: San Francisco becomes the first major city to pass a voter initiative adopting instant-runoff voting (IRV) for certain citywide elections.
- 2007: Maryland becomes the first state to pass the National Popular Vote Interstate Compact.
- 2016: Maine becomes the first state to adopt IRV statewide with support from FairVote and FairVote Maine.
- 2017: Congressman Don Beyer introduces the Fair Representation Act at an event organized by FairVote.
- 2018: Utah passes a law enabling cities to use IRV.
- 2019: New York City adopts IRV, and the Democratic National Committee approves use of IRV ballots in five party-run presidential primaries and caucuses in 2020.
- 2020: 2020 Alaska Measure 2 passes, making Alaska the first state to adopt the top-four primary system.
- 2022: Nevada voters approve a ballot measure to adopt IRV statewide. As a citizen-initiated constitutional amendment, it had to pass again in 2024 to take effect.
- 2023: Oregon's legislature refers a statewide IRV measure to the 2024 ballot.
- 2024: Multiple cities, including DC, pass IRV ballot initiatives supported by FairVote. Oregon and Nevada's IRV initiatives fail. Alaska retains IRV.

FairVote is headquartered in Silver Spring, Maryland.

== Ideology ==
In his New York Times profile of FairVote co-founder Steven Hill, Scott James called FairVote a "left-wing group". Other writers have claimed that many FairVote policies, such as IRV, are popular in "liberal enclaves" and supported by "populist groups" such as Common Cause, an advocacy organization, and thus give the group a liberal tilt. Louis Jacobson, a writer for Roll Call, argued that any group supporting the National Popular Vote Interstate Compact would be perceived as liberal-leaning because of Democratic frustration with the Electoral College after the 2000 US presidential election.

FairVote co-founder Rob Richie said the group "is definitely not a Democratic stalking horse", noting that John B. Anderson, the former head of its national advisory board, was a Republican in the 1970s (before his 1980 presidential campaign as an independent and his support for Ralph Nader's 2000 campaign).

== Proposed reforms ==
=== Ranked choice voting ===
FairVote advocates using ranked choice voting (IRV). Specifically, it advocates the instant-runoff form of RCV in single-winner elections and the single transferable vote for multi-winner elections. FairVote supports the Fair Representation Act, which would enact a single transferable vote system for U.S. House elections and an instant runoff voting system for U.S. Senate elections.

In 2002, FairVote backed a San Francisco ballot initiative amending Section 13.102 of the city charter to allow IRV in local elections. The city began using IRV to elect local officials on November 2, 2004. Subsequent ballot initiatives supported by FairVote have allowed the use of IRV in cities including Minneapolis, Oakland, Portland, Seattle, New York City, and Santa Fe.

=== National popular vote ===
FairVote has advocated for the National Popular Vote Interstate Compact, an agreement among states and the District of Columbia to award their electoral votes to the candidate with the highest popular vote total in all 50 states and D.C. New York Assemblyman Fred Thiele said he first proposed New York's entrance into the compact after FairVote approached him.

=== Voting rights ===
FairVote backed the proposed Right to Vote Amendment (House Joint Resolution 44), sponsored by Representatives Mark Pocan and Keith Ellison, under which citizens would be guaranteed a constitutional right to vote. FairVote filed a policy brief in support of the legislation, writing, "We believe that the right to vote is a cornerstone of representative democracy that depends upon broadly defined voter eligibility, universal voter access to the polls, and election integrity." FairVote also advocated for universal voter registration.

== Research and reports ==
=== Election research ===
FairVote has conducted research on both presidential and Congressional elections. Most of its presidential election research focuses on the electoral college's effects on campaigning. In its 2012 Presidential Election analysis, FairVote documented the large disparity in both time and money spent in swing states versus safe states. FairVote has published data on how much time sitting presidents spend in swing states.

FairVote released two main documents of Congressional research during previous elections. "Monopoly Politics" contained predictions and analysis for each race. "Dubious Democracy" was an assessment of how competitive elections were by state and how much power votes had in each state.

After the 2010 midterm elections, FairVote released data on the effect of third-party and spoiler candidates. The report found that in many districts the winning candidate did not receive a majority of the vote.

Finally, FairVote created Representation 2020, a project with the goal of electing more women to address gender parity in elections. Representation2020 has since become a separate nonprofit called RepresentWomen. It still aligns with FairVote.

== Involvement in court cases ==
FairVote has participated in a number of court cases as amici curiae to advance IRV and proportional voting methods, particularly under the California and federal Voting Rights Act. Cases in which it has been involved include:

=== Sanchez v. City of Modesto (2007) ===
Sanchez v. City of Modesto (2007) dealt with the constitutionality of the California Voting Rights Act of 2001 (CVRA).

After the California Superior Court of Stanislaus County declared the CVRA unconstitutional in favor of the City of Modesto, plaintiffs Enrique Sanchez, Emma Pinedo and Salvador Vera appealed to the Fifth Appellate District of the Court of Appeal of California.

Along with Kathay Feng from the organization California Common Cause, FairVote submitted an amicus curiae brief in favor of the plaintiffs.

FairVote argued that winner-take-all at-large voting systems caused "vote dilutions in jurisdictions affected by racially polarized voting, even where minority voters cannot form a majority in a single member district."

Supporting the CVRA, FairVote viewed the law requiring courts to "fashion effective remedies to cure vote dilution affecting smaller and dispersed minority populations."

Asserting that the CVRA allows California to become more representative of the people, FairVote concluded that the CVRA was an important and constitutional piece of government reform. The Court of Appeal applied rational basis review to CVRA and declared the law constitutional, reversing the lower court's decision.

=== United States v. Village of Port Chester (2008) ===
In December 2006, the United States Department of Justice alleged that Port Chester's at-large system of electing its board of trustees violated Section 2 of the Voting Rights Act of 1965. The U.S. government claimed that the at-large electoral system denied the Hispanic population "an equal opportunity to participate in the political process and to elect representatives of their choice."

In United States v. Village of Port Chester (2008), U.S. District Judge Stephen Robinson of the United States District Court for the Southern District of New York issued a decision that the Village's election system violated the Voting Rights Act and ordered remedial plans from all parties.

The defendants in the case, the Village of Port Chester, proposed cumulative voting as a remedy, which "allows citizens to cast multiple votes for a given candidate for a given seat."

In 2007, the Brennan Center, representing FairVote, submitted a brief supporting cumulative voting as a remedy, but also proposing another system known as "choice voting", a process of ranking candidates. FairVote argued that "cumulative and choice voting avoid the necessity for deliberately drawing districts along racial lines" and that a winner-take-all system would not allow the Hispanic minority population to gain representation.

FairVote also argued that cumulative voting is appropriate under the Voting Rights Act, as it "ensures the equal principle of "one-person, one vote"", is race-neutral, and that it is supported by case law and history. On November 6, 2009, the Court did not accept choice voting but accepted Port Chester's remedy of cumulative voting. On June 16, 2010, Port Chester elected its first Latino to the Board of Trustees.

=== Minnesota Voters Alliance v. City of Minneapolis (2009) ===
FairVote Minnesota is an independent organization aligned with FairVote.

FairVote Minnesota, siding with the City of Minneapolis, served as intervenor-respondent in Minnesota Voters Alliance v. City of Minneapolis, a case that was attested at the Minnesota Supreme Court.

Minnesota Voters Alliance v. City of Minneapolis dealt with the constitutionality of IRV, which was adopted by the City of Minneapolis for its municipal elections.

Minnesota Voters Alliance, a nonprofit organization that served as the appellants, argued that the "method violates their right to vote, to associate for political purposes, and to equal protection under both the United States and the Minnesota Constitutions".

Siding with the city, FairVote Minnesota stated that instant-runoff voting (IRV) is a form of IRV that allows voters to rank multiple candidates on a single ballot. They argued that this form of voting has legitimate policy reasons, such as simplifying the election process, saving money, increasing voter turnout, ensuring more diverse representation, and promoting civil election campaigns.

In its defense of the City of Minneapolis, FairVote argued that the appellants bore a "heavy burden of persuasion" because they brought a facial challenge to IRV's constitutionality and that "Minneapolis IRV is constitutional because it is supported by legitimate interests, imposes no burden on the right to vote, and applies to all voters".

The Court affirmed the lower district court's ruling that IRV does not infringe on the appellants' constitutional rights, thus rejecting the Minnesota Voters Alliance's challenge to IRV. After the result, Jeanne Massey, executive director of FairVote Minnesota, applauded the decision and said that the Court "blazed a path that every community in our state can follow toward better elections and a stronger democracy" and that the decision was "a resounding endorsement of ranked choice voting".

=== Jauregi v. City of Palmdale (2014) ===
Juan Jauregui filed a complaint in April 2012 alleging that Palmdale's at-large method of electing members to its City Council resulted in vote dilution for Latino and African American residents.

The lawsuit claimed that Palmdale's at-large method denied minority residents effective political participation and thus violated the California Voting Rights Act (CVRA). The case was brought up to Judge Mooney of the Superior Court of the State of California in the County of Los Angeles. In July 2013, Mooney declared that the CVRA vested the court in implementing appropriate remedies in favor of the plaintiffs.

The City of Palmdale immediately appealed the decision, reasoning that in 2001 Palmdale residents voted for an at-large election system. The case reached the California Court of Appeal in the Second Appellate District.

In January 2014, FairVote submitted an amicus curiae brief in support of the plaintiffs.

FairVote argued that fair representation voting, unlike at-large systems, enhanced minority groups to elect at least one candidate of their choice. FairVote advocated for a number of alternative methods, such as ranked choice voting, single voting, and cumulative voting. The City of Palmdale opposed FairVote's participation, arguing that the amicus brief "threatens significant prejudice to the City", as it would continue to delay the certification of the city's November 2013 election. The California Court of Appeal denied FairVote's application to file as amicus curiae.

== See also ==
- Forward Party (United States)
- The Center for Election Science
- The Equal Vote Coalition
- Electoral reform in the United States
