= Electoral reform in the United States =

Efforts to change electoral systems

Electoral reform in the United States refers to the efforts of change for American elections and the electoral system used in the US.

United States House of Representatives elections are generally conducted in single-member (SMD) first-past-the-post elections (FPTP). Senate seats are elected statewide, generally in staggered terms in FPTP elections, although some states use ranked-choice voting, jungle primaries, or runoff elections.

US House seats must be reapportioned every ten years. When a state gains or loses representatives, districts must be redrawn. The redistricting process is often contentious and may result in intentionally disproportionate representation of Congressional delegations, referred to as gerrymandering. Electoral reform advocacy groups often propose eliminating partisan gerrymandering through independent redistricting or proportional representation.

The Electoral College elects the US president. Each state uses a winner-take-all general ticket model (except Maine and Nebraska). Some electoral reformers have advocated to abolish the electoral college or distribute electoral votes proportionally to a state's popular vote. Legislative support for electoral college reform has become a partisan issue.

Following the Supreme Court's decision in Citizens United v. FEC, critics of money in politics have advocated for public funding of campaigns and a reversal of the decision either by the court itself or by constitutional amendment.

Other common electoral reform proposals include altering the size of the House, adopting different voting systems (such as single transferable vote or cumulative voting), and altering voter registration laws.

== Electoral reform proposals ==
Many proposed reforms can be achieved at least in part by legislation, though some require amending the U.S. Constitution.

The campaign to overturn the ruling in Citizens United v. FEC and the campaign to abolish the Electoral College are two of the most prominent movements by electoral reform advocates to alter the US Constitution.

=== Campaign finance reform ===
==== Public funding of campaigns ====
Along with constitutional law scholar Bruce Ackerman, American legal scholar Lawrence Lessig recommended giving each eligible voter a "democracy voucher" worth, e.g., $100 each election year that can only be spent on political candidates or issues. The amount would be fixed at roughly double the amount of private money spent in the previous election cycle. Unlike the current Presidential election campaign fund checkoff, decisions regarding who gets campaign money would be made by individual citizens.

The system in New York City provides a 5-to-1 match for contributions up to $250. To be eligible for money from vouchers, rebates or matching funds, candidates must accept certain limits on the amounts of money raised from individual contributors.

The Supreme Court of the United States has already struck down many forms of public funding of political campaigns.

"The Grassroots Democracy Act" was introduced September 14, 2012, by U.S. Representative John Sarbanes as H.R. 6426 and reintroduced on January 15, 2013, as H.R. 268.

==== Overturning Citizens United ====
The Citizens United v. FEC decision, January 21, 2010, of the U.S. Supreme Court has received substantial notoriety. Many people and organizations have pushed for a constitutional amendment to overturn it. Key provisions of the Citizens United decision assert in that money is speech and subject to first amendment protections. Move to Amend began organizing to oppose the decision in September 2009. By June 2013, they had at least 164 local affiliates in 36 states plus the District of Columbia. The group had obtained roughly 300,000 individual signatures for their Motion to Amend and had secured the passage of 367 local resolutions and ordinances. United for the People is consortium of some 144 organizations supporting a constitutional amendment to overturn Citizens United. The website of United for the People lists 17 constitutional amendments introduced in the 112th United States Congress and 12 introduced by March 13, 2013, in the 113th proposing to overturn Citizens United in different ways.

The libertarian think-tank the Cato Institute argued that most proposed responses to Citizens United would give "Congress unchecked new power over spending on political speech, power that will be certainly abused."

==== Campaign finance disclosures ====
The DISCLOSE Act would require disclosure of the sources of campaign funds. The DISCLOSE Act bill seeks "to prohibit foreign influence in Federal elections, to prohibit government contractors from making expenditures with respect to such elections, and to establish additional disclosure requirements with respect to spending in such elections, and for other purposes."

The California Clean Money Campaign pushed for the California DISCLOSE act, which differs substantially from the federal DISCLOSE Act. The California bill would strengthen disclosure requirements for political advertisements. Among other provisions, it requires the top three contributors for any political ad to be identified by name on the ad.

Ackerman and Ayres propose a "secret donation booth" as opposed to full disclosure. This system would require that all campaign contributions be anonymously given through a government agency. Their system would give donors a few days to change their minds and withdraw or change the recipient of a donation. It would also add a random time delay to ensure that the recipients of donations could never know for sure the source of the funds they receive.

=== Electing Supreme Court justices ===
The implementation of term limits and elections for Supreme Court justices has been proposed as an alternative to the current Senate confirmation system, which has become more partisan in recent years due to political polarization. One proposed system would mirror the current way 33 states select their state supreme court justices. William Watkins Jr., a constitutional scholar from the Independent Institute on National Public Radio stated his proposal for a justice to serve a single 8 to 10-year term, with the one-term limit intended to reduce reliance on campaign donors.

=== Abolishing the Electoral College ===
There have long been debates over the Electoral College and methods of selecting the president and vice president. Currently, the candidate that wins a plurality in a given state gets all that state's electoral votes via a general ticket. In Maine and Nebraska, each congressional district gives one electoral vote and two electoral votes are given for the statewide winner. Two states, Alaska and Maine, require a majority of votes for a candidate to receive electoral votes, using ranked-choice voting.

Modern polling has allowed presidential campaigns to determine which states are "swing states" (also called "battleground states") that are most likely to tip the electoral college toward a victory to either party. As a result, campaigns focus primarily on swing states. Opponents of the Electoral College argue the focus on swing states prevents non-swing-states from having an influence on the outcome of elections.

Officially abolishing the Electoral College would require amending the U.S. Constitution. The National Popular Vote Interstate Compact is an attempt to work around this by using states' plenary power to decide how electoral votes are distributed to tie electoral votes to the popular vote. The compact, if passed and upheld in court, would empower non-swing-states to affect the outcome of the election. To take effect it must be approved by states with electoral votes totaling 270, just over half of the 538 current total electoral votes.

=== Proposed replacements to the current voting system ===
==== Approval voting ====
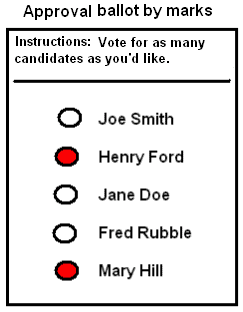
With approval voting, voters select candidates that they approve of.

Approval voting is system in which voters may select all candidates that meet the voter's approval. The candidate with the highest approval score (i.e. approved by the most voters) wins the election. In elections with three or more candidates, voters may indicate approval of more than one candidate.

Approval voting is promoted by The Center for Election Science.

In 2017, the Colorado legislature considered approval voting. If the bill had passed, Colorado would have been the first state to approve approval voting legislation, but the bill was postponed indefinitely.

In 2018, Fargo, North Dakota, passed a local ballot initiative adopting approval voting for the city's local elections, and it was used to elect officials in June 2020, becoming the first United States city and jurisdiction to adopt approval voting. In 2023, the North Dakota Legislative Assembly introduced Bill HB 1273, which would ban approval voting statewide. The bill passed both the house and senate before being vetoed by Governor Doug Burgum. The veto was overridden by two-thirds majority in the house but upheld in the senate, leaving approval voting as Fargo's voting method.

In November 2020, St. Louis passed Proposition D to authorize a variant of approval voting (as unified primary) for municipal offices. In a primary field of four candidates, St. Louis Treasurer Tishaura Jones and Alderwoman Cara Spencer advanced to the general election. The two women defeated President of the St. Louis Board of Aldermen Lewis E. Reed as well as utility manager Andrew Jones. The election was the first in the nation to use approval voting for a primary. Jones defeated Spencer in the general election by nearly 4% of votes cast, becoming the first African-American woman elected St. Louis mayor.

==== Ranked choice voting ====
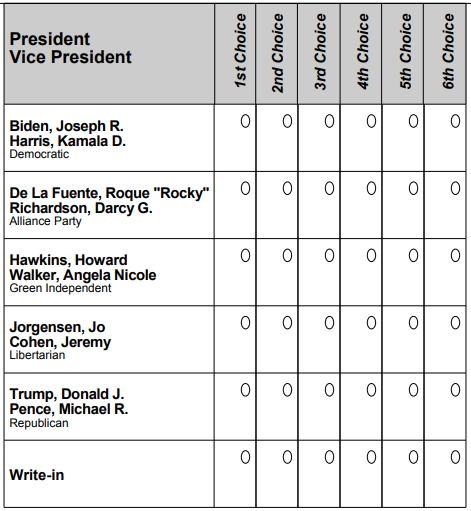
The State of Maine's ranked-choice voting presidential ballot

Ranked voting allows each voter to list their candidates from favorite to least-favorite. One popular variant in the United States is instant-runoff voting (IRV), where the candidate with the fewest votes is repeatedly eliminated, at which point their supporters are reassigned to less-preferred candidates.

IRV is being promoted in the U.S. by numerous individuals and organizations. One of these is FairVote, which provides a long list of endorsers of IRV, including President Obama, Senators John McCain and Bernie Sanders, five U.S. Representatives, policy analyst Michael E Arth, the Green, Libertarian, and Socialist parties, a dozen state chapters of the League of Women Voters, four state chapters of the Democratic Party, the Republican Party of Alaska, and many others. It is currently being used in some jurisdictions in the U.S., including the state of Maine and, since November 2020, the state of Alaska.

The Institute for Political Innovation, along with organizations such as Unite America and Nevada Voters, supports "final five voting" which consists of a combination of general primaries to elect the top five candidates, with instant-runoff voting to decide the winner. A similar system was approved in Alaska via a 2020 ballot measure.

==== Proportional representation ====
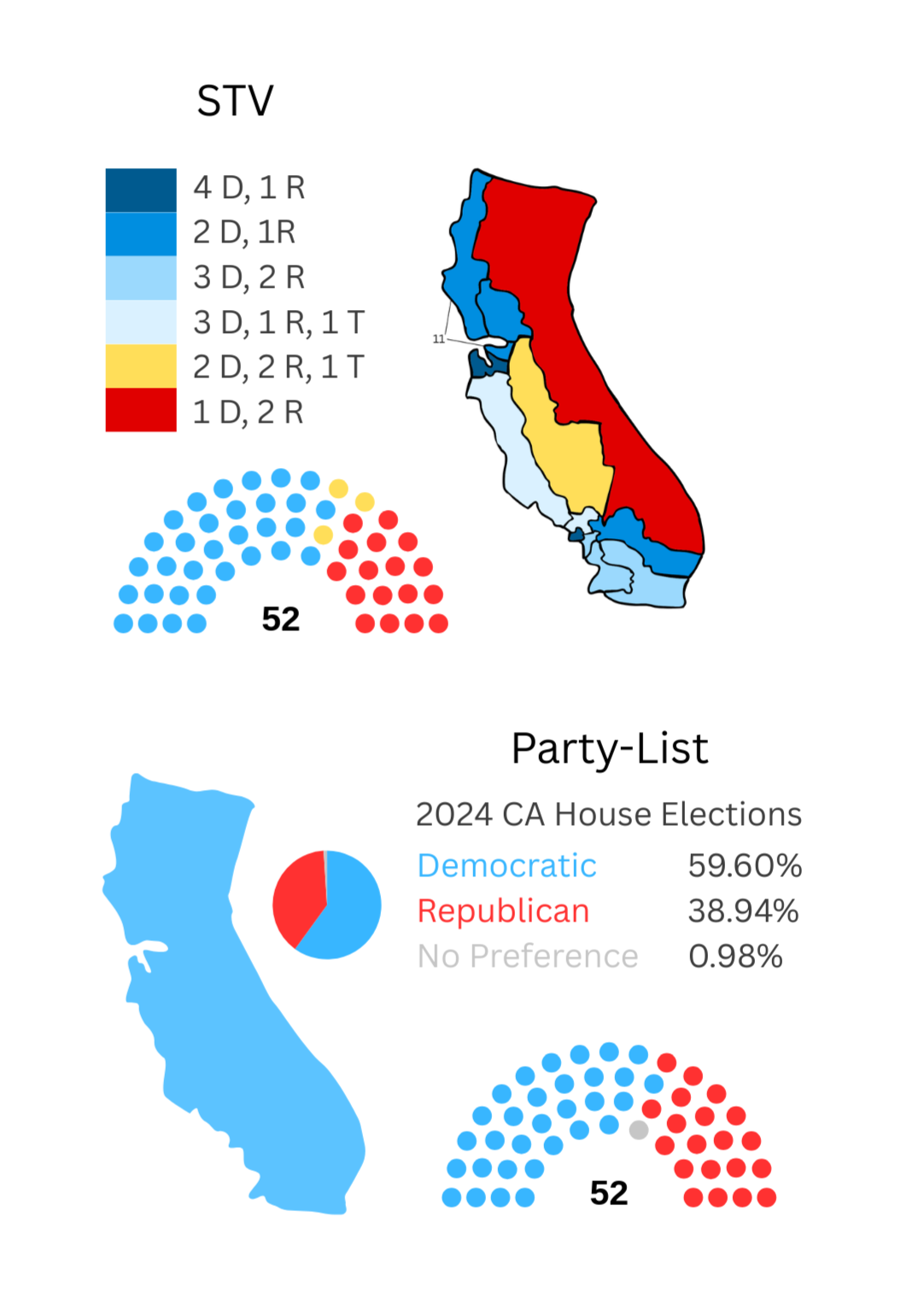
On top is an estimate by Fairvote of party results in US House races in California under the Fair Representation Act. Below is an example of a party-list system that more directly elects candidates in proportion to their vote share. How many seats would go to new parties is a matter of debate among American political scientists.

Fair Representation Act proposes to introduce STV, along with the multi-member districts, for elections to the House of Representatives. Due to the Uniform Congressional District Act of 1967, it is illegal for a state with more than one representative to elect its representatives in multi-member districts or in an at-large election, whether the election method used is proportional or not.

=== Redistricting ===
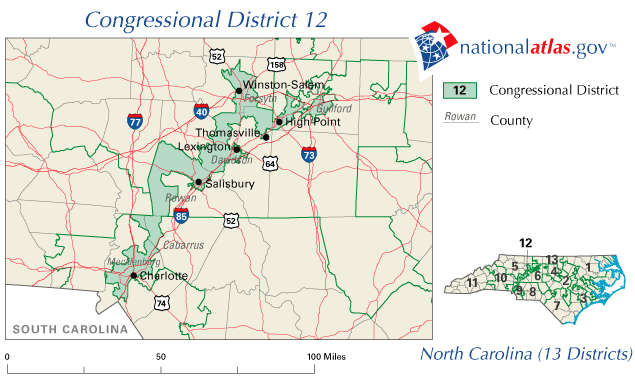
North Carolina's 12th congressional district between 2003 and 2016 was an example of gerrymandering.

In the United States House of Representatives and many other legislative bodies such as city councils, members are elected from districts, whose boundaries are changed periodically through a process known as redistricting. When this process is manipulated to benefit a particular political party or incumbent, the result is known as gerrymandering. The Open Our Democracy Act and the For the People Act are bills designed to end gerrymandering. The For the People Act passed the United States House of Representatives on March 3, 2020. As of June 2021, it has not been passed by the United States Senate.

=== Compulsory voting ===
Voting is not required of citizens in any state, so elections are highly influenced by turnout. Politicians may aim to increase partisan turnout, rather than campaigning for undecided or swing voters. Compulsory voting supporters argue it would increase turnout generally.

Compulsory voting has been criticized as "vaguely un-American" but potentially beneficial to democracy.

Compulsory voting has been proposed as a solution to make the pool of voters better represent the American population, particularly racially and socioeconomically.

=== Early voting ===
Early voting allows voters to cast their ballots before election day, allowing for more flexibility and accessibility. This can take place in two forms: in-person or mail-in voting.

From 2016 to 2020, 14 states adopted both early in-person and mail-in voting as an option to vote before election day. Mail-in voting was especially adopted during the COVID-19 pandemic.

Options to vote before election day have been widely popular among voters in the two most recent presidential elections. According to the Center for Election Innovation & Research, 40% of votes were cast before Election Day in 2016, and 69% were cast before Election Day in 2020. Proponents of the expansion of early voting argue for its ability to increase voter turnout and reduce long lines at polls.

Opponents argue early voting undermines the concept of election day. Mail-in ballots featured prominently in disputes over the 2020 presidential election.

=== Other proposals ===
Other proposals to alter election rules include:

- Moving Election Day to a weekend to make it easier for workers to attend or allowing early voting on weekend days
- Providing voters better information on the consequences of ballot questions
- Raising Congressional salaries to reduce the influence of money in politics
- Having longer terms in office to better match economic cycles, particularly in combination with term limits
- Require candidates to have qualification in terms of education, profession, or life experience
- Weighing voters differently according to qualifications, such as passing a civics test
- Enacting federal restrictions or enforcement against voter suppression techniques
- Enacting stricter voter ID requirements
- Amending the Constitution to guarantee the right to vote in general, rather than only prohibiting certain forms of discrimination.
- Enacting automatic universal voter registration
- Increasing access to mail-in voting
- Ending felony disenfranchisement in the United States for those who have completed their sentences

== Organizations supporting reforms ==
Notable organizations that support some variant of at least one of the reforms mentioned above include:

- Brennan Center for Justice
- Common Cause
- Equal Citizens
- FairVote
- The Center for Election Science
- League of Women Voters
- Move to Amend
- National Popular Vote Inc.
- Open Primaries
- People for the American Way
- Public Citizen
- RepresentWomen
- RepresentUs
- Rootstrikers

== See also ==
- Term limits in the United States
- Electoral reform
- Voting rights in the United States
- Reform of the Senate
