= FVU =

FVU may refer to:

- Fraction of variance unexplained
- Forth Valley Unity (FVU), community organisation in the Forth Valley region of Scotland
- flux valve unit; see List of aviation, avionics, aerospace and aeronautical abbreviations
- FVU (ФВУ; Russian: Фильтровентиляционные установки, romanized: filter ventillation unit), chemical filtration unit as found on Soviet armor, see BMP-3
- FVU (Danish: Forberedende Voksenuddannelse, lit. 'Preparatory Adult Education') at Danish Voksenuddannelsescenter (VUC) (Danish: Adult Education Center)
- Ukrainian Volleyball Federation (FVU, ФВУ; Ukrayins'ka Federetsiya Voleybolu; fvu.in.ua), which administers the Ukrainian Women's Volleyball Super League and Ukrainian Men's Volleyball Super League and national volleyball teams
- Veurne (station code FVU), West Flanders, Belgium; a train station, see List of railway stations in Belgium

== See also ==
- FW (disambiguation)
- Fuu (disambiguation)
- FVV (disambiguation)
- FUV (disambiguation)
- F5U (disambiguation)
