= FSU =

FSU may refer to:

== Universities ==
- Fairmont State University, West Virginia
- Fayetteville State University, North Carolina
- Ferris State University, Michigan
- Fitchburg State University, Massachusetts
- Florida State University, a large public research university in Tallahassee, Florida
- Framingham State University, Massachusetts
- Frostburg State University, Maryland
- University of Jena, (Friedrich-Schiller-Universität Jena), Thuringia, Germany
- California State University, Fresno, which brands itself as Fresno State University

== Trade unions ==
- Fédération Syndicale Unitaire, French trade union, largest in the public sector
- Finance Sector Union, Australian trade union
- Financial Services Union, Irish trade union

== Other uses ==
- Floating storage unit, a statically moored vessel used for temporary storage, (e.g. oil).
- Former Soviet Union, collective term for the fifteen countries that formed the Soviet Union until 1991
- Free Speech Union, British organisation founded in 2020
- Free Speech Union (New Zealand), New Zealand group founded as the Free Speech Coalition in 2018, renamed to Free Speech Union in 2021
- Friends Stand United, street gang
- Fuse-Switch-Unit, opposite of SFU, relating to the order an electrical fuse is inserted in a circuit
