= Friedrich Wilhelm University =

Friedrich Wilhelm University (German: Friedrich-Wilhelms-Universität) may refer to:

- Humboldt University of Berlin, called Friedrich-Wilhelms-Universität from 1828 to 1949, and sometimes known in English as Frederick William University
- University of Bonn, officially named Rheinische Friedrich-Wilhelms-Universität Bonn
- University of Wrocław, called the Schlesische Friedrich-Wilhelms-Universität zu Breslau from 1911 to 1945
