= Arcimoto FUV =

2019 battery electric microcar

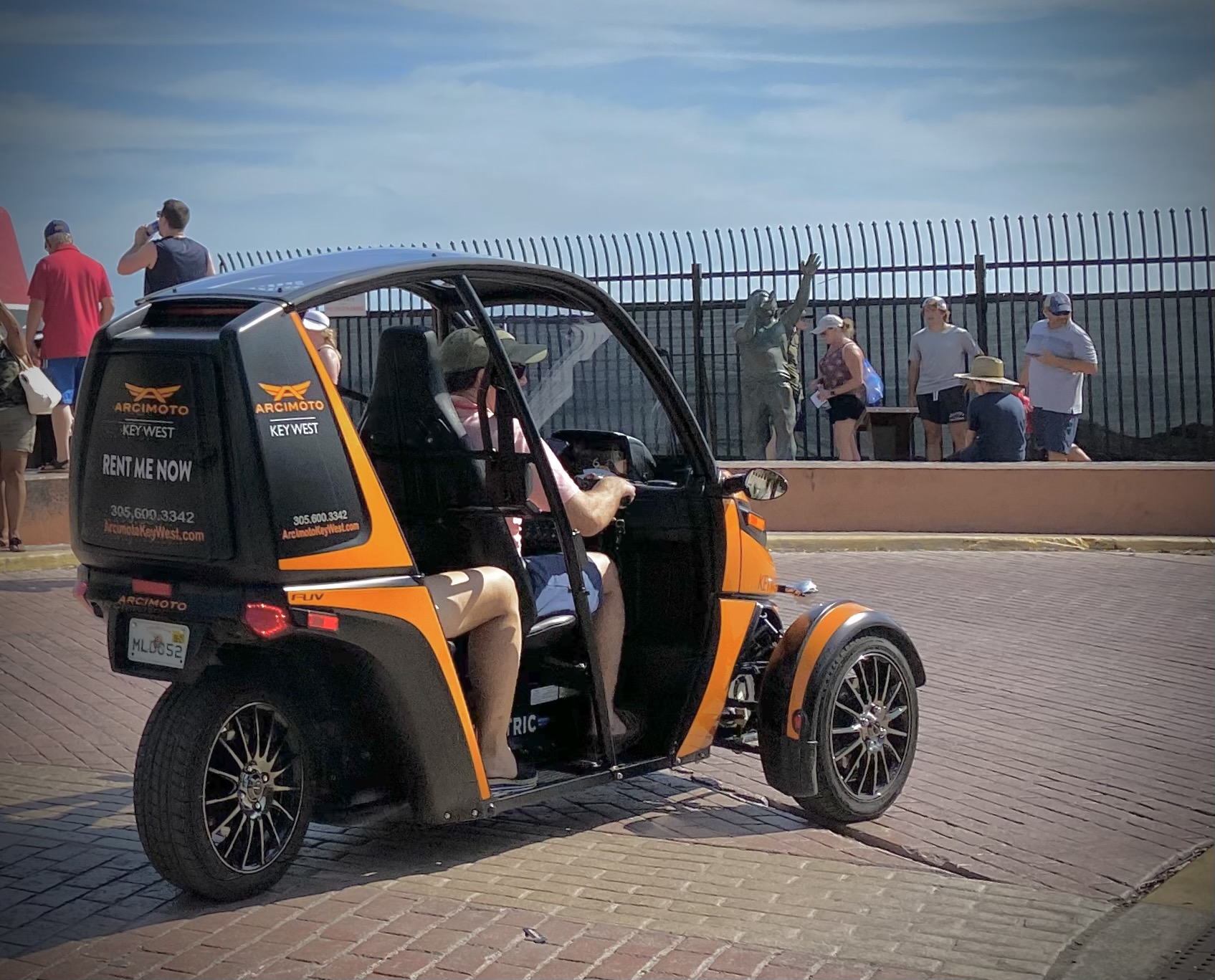

Overview
- Manufacturer: Arcimoto
- Production: 2019–present
- Assembly: United States: Eugene, Oregon

Body and chassis
- Class: Microcar, Three-wheeled motorcycle

Powertrain
- Engine: Electric motor

Dimensions
- Wheelbase: 79 in (2,007 mm)
- Length: 114 in (2,896 mm)
- Width: 59 in (1,499 mm)
- Height: 67 in (1,702 mm)
- Curb weight: 1,799 lb (816 kg)

The Arcimoto FUV is a battery-electric, three-wheeled motorcycle produced by Arcimoto since 2019. It has a top speed of 75 mph (121 km/h) and an estimated range of 102 miles (164 km) in an urban environment.

The vehicle takes the form of a car and a motorcycle combined into a tricycle with two wheels on the front and a single wheel on the opposite side and a motorcycle-like twistgrip drive. The narrow and high body was designed to accommodate two passengers in seats placed one behind the other.

== History ==
The creation of the first production Arcimoto car was preceded by a 12-year construction process, which was initiated by a series of 6 prototypes, presented successively as a development of the previous one. The final result of this work was the Arcimoto FUV model, presented in February 2019, deriving its name from the abbreviation of the words Fun Utility Vehicle, expressing the character of the vehicle. The FUV went on sale in the United States, just after its market debut in February 2019. The price for the cheapest model was $17,900.

In July 2021, a pre-production unit supporting autonomous driving without the participation of the driver was presented.

== Vehicle ==
The FUV's 77 hp (57 kW) electric motor allows a top speed of 75 mph (121 km/h) and acceleration to 60 mph (97 km/h) in 7.5 seconds. Arcimoto measures its range in a city environment at 102 miles (164 km). The lithium-ion battery with a capacity of 20 kWh also allows the driver to drive at 55 mph (89 km/h) for 66 miles (106 km) and at 70 mph (110 km/h) for 32 miles (51 km) on a single charge.

The structure of the body was formed by exposed piping with a large windshield.

== Variants ==
In 2021, the offer of body variants of FUV was also extended to include a delivery variant called Arcimoto Deliverator, as well as a model with an open body without windows called Arcimoto Roadster.
