= Arcimoto =

Electric vehicle company headquartered in Eugene, Oregon

Arcimoto, Inc.

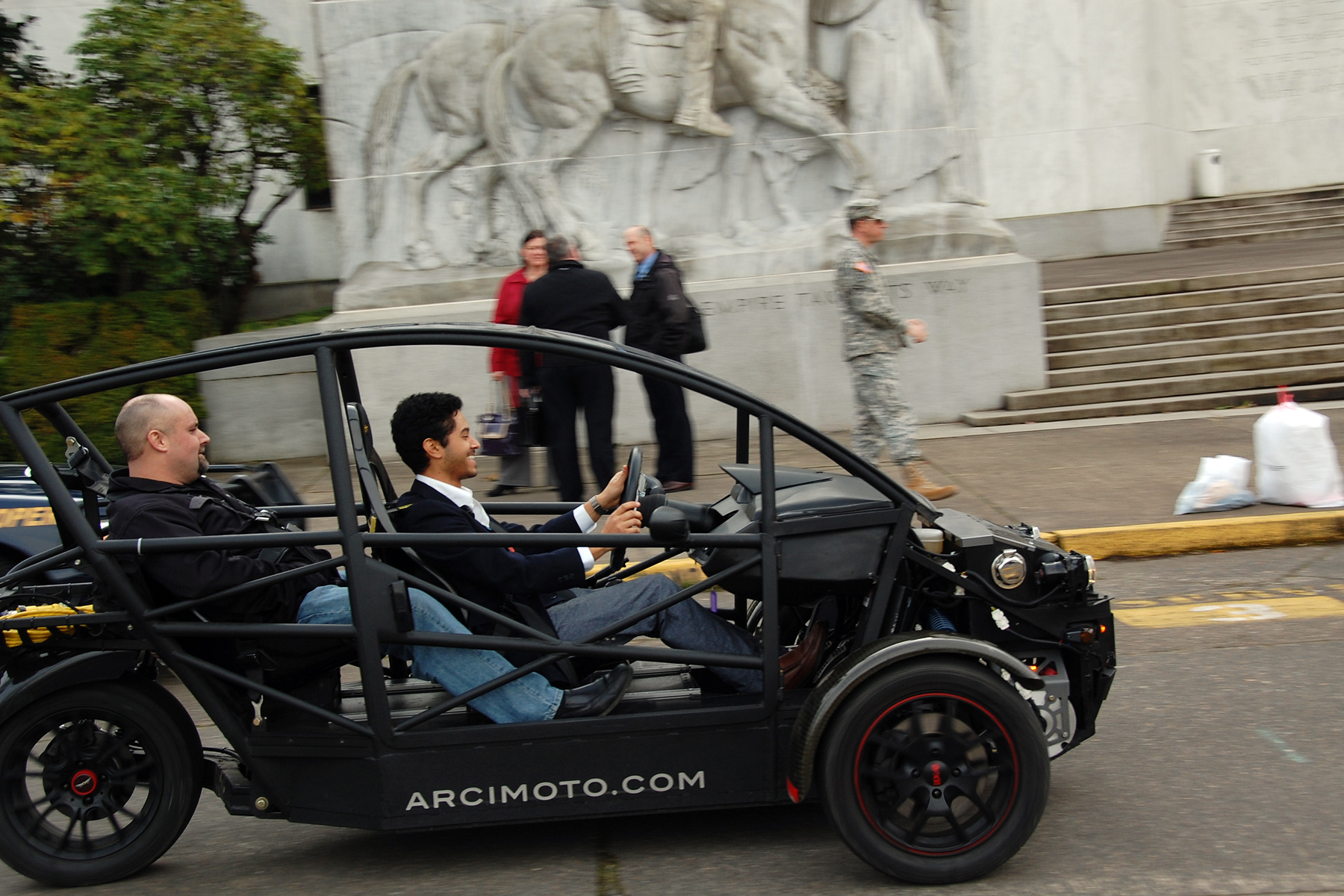
- Arcimoto test drive
- Type: Public
- Traded as: Expert Market: FUVV; formerly: ~~Nasdaq: FUV~~
- Industry: Automotive
- Founded: November 2007; 18 years ago in Eugene, Oregon
- Founder: Mark Frohnmayer
- Headquarters: Eugene, Oregon, United States
- Key people: Christopher Dawson (CEO); Jesse Fittipaldi (president)
- Products: Electric vehicles
- Website: arcimoto.com

Arcimoto, Inc. is an electric vehicle company headquartered in Eugene, Oregon, that designs, manufactures, and sells the FUV—a tandem two-seat, three-wheeled electric vehicle—and its four variations.

Due to failure in scaling production to reduce unit price, Arcimoto ran into financial troubles in 2023, which stopped all production and resulted in the company being delisted from NASDAQ. At its peak in February 2021, Arcimoto held a market capitalization of $1.2 billion, which fell to $3,690 as of July 2024.

== Company overview ==
=== History ===
On September 23, 2009, Arcimoto debuted the Pulse, with an estimated $20,000 price, taking pre-orders for $500. The Pulse is now considered a Generation 3 prototype by the company.

On April 23, 2011, Arcimoto revealed their fifth prototype, and the first SRK. According to Founder Mark Frohnmayer, actor Nathan Fillion drove their vehicle and came out saying it was like driving a shark, which is where the name SRK came from. This model added extra power (89 hp) and four body designs on a common chassis. According to Frohnmayer, Generation 6 SRK, revealed in April 2012, was to be the pilot with 14 vehicles produced, 10 of which already had committed purchasers, then the pilot run had been increased to 40 units, sold for $41,000 each. Some time later, Generation 7 was expected to be the mass production model in late 2012 but the company determined it was too large and heavy to create a viable market solution and opted to develop an eighth prototype generation that featured handlebars instead of a steering wheel.

In 2017, Arcimoto filed an IPO and was listed on NASDAQ as FUV and soon after began delivering its first production vehicle named the FUV.

In June 2020, Arcimoto started working with Sandy Munro to streamline the design and manufacture.

In mid-January 2023, Arcimoto, running low on cash, idled its factory and floated the possibility of bankruptcy. From April 2024 to May 2025, the Arcimoto website was deactivated and inaccessible. Arcimoto's 2023 Q3 report showed it with $9.5 million of bills past due and $232k on hand. As of April 2024, the company has not produced its 2023 Q4 report, has defaulted in several judgements on unpaid bills, and was delisted from NASDAQ.

In May 2025, the Arcimoto website was reinstated in a simplified form, showing only the FUV and MUV models.

To date, Arcimoto has designed and built eight generations of three-wheeled electric vehicle prototypes.

== Products ==
Arcimoto produces multiple products based on the same vehicle platform. The vehicles have 102 miles (164 km) of range from the battery electric powertrain. The platform is divided into the FUV for personal use, the Rapid Responder for emergency services, and the Deliverator for last-mile and local delivery. Future variations of the platform have been announced, such as the Cameo and flatbed truck variants; public information is still limited.

=== Three-Wheeled Platform ===
==== Technical specifications ====
Claimed Performance

| Acceleration | 0–60 miles per hour (0–97 km/h) in 7.5s |
| Top Speed | 75 mph (121 km/h) |
| Turning Radius | 29 feet (8.8 m) |
| Power | 77 bhp (57 kW) |
| Range | 100 miles (160 km) city 66 miles (106 km) @ 55 mph (89 km/h); 32 miles (51 km) @ 70 mph (110 km/h) |

Weight & Measures

| Overall Length | 113 in (2,900 mm) |
| Overall Width | 61 in (1,500 mm) |
| Max Height | 65 in (1,700 mm) |
| Ground Clearance | 5.5 in (140 mm) unladen |
| Wheelbase | 80 in (2,000 mm) |
| Shipping Weight | 300 lb (140 kg) |
| GVWR | 1,800 lb (820 kg) |

Features

| Battery System | Lithium-Ion (NMC) |
| Integrated Charger | 120V (Level 1) & 240V (Level 2) Auto-Switching |
| Passengers | 2 in Tandem Configuration |
| Brakes | Hydraulic with Regenerative Assist |
| Seat Belts | Dual Shoulder/Lap Belts on Both Seats |
| Direction | Forward & Reverse w/40-Degree Turning |

==== Additional product specs ====
In an interview, the CEO of Arcimoto stated that the vehicles use off-the-shelf motor controllers, battery cells, and switched reluctance motors, as well as a two-stage reduction gearbox developed and built in house. He also stated that the vehicles contain two single speed parallel gear trains with a 7:1 ratio. The Arcimoto website contains none of this technical information, and these claims have not yet been confirmed by a third-party source.

==== Manufacturing/AMP ====
The Arcimoto Manufacturing Plant is Arcimoto's original production facility. The company began leasing the building October 1, 2017. Arcimoto held a grand opening ceremony on November 29, 2017, where Arcimoto's president reflected on the progress made over eight generations of their vehicle platform. Upon building out the interior with equipment capable of producing up to 5,000 units per year, they began production on September 19, 2019.

The company plans to refine their manufacturing processes and product platform, and then use the AMP as a template for future AMPs. According to an Arcimoto earnings review, the CEO stated plans for subsequent AMPs that are projected to support 50,000 to 100,000 units per year. Except for an east coast AMP in the US, new AMPs will be built as joint ventures. The company plans to have local production capacity in Europe, Southeast Asia, and another, undetermined location.

==== Second manufacturing facility ====
In 2021, Arcimoto purchased a manufacturing facility, unofficially dubbed the RAMP, about a city block away from AMP 1. It was previously owned by Pacific Metal Fab, a metal fabrication business, resulting in minimal remodel work needing to be completed. RAMP is 185,000 square feet or roughly five times larger than AMP 1. Once fully ramped, the company expects to produce 25,000 vehicles in this facility. The first vehicles off the line are due by the end of 2021.

==== Batteries ====
As of 2021, Arcimoto is utilizing cells made by the manufacturer Farasis Energy, a Chinese-based battery cell supplier. Farasis will add additional production capacity in the United States and Europe. This will enable lower costs for Arcimoto, reduced lead time, and decrease the likelihood of logistical delays concerning the physical distance and political climate between the US and China. As of May 2020, their supplier was conducting site selection in the US.

The FUV platform uses pouch cells with a Lithium-Nickel Manganese Cobalt (NMC) battery chemistry of about 30 Ah each from Farasis Energy, which are the same as Zero Motorcycle's cells or the cells in the Polaris / Brammo Empulse. The cells combine to a total of 19.2 kWh in the FUV battery in a 28s 6p configuration. In conventional EV battery notation, "6p" means that cells are combined in groups of 6 cells in parallel (for 180 Ah of total capacity), and "28s" means that 28 of those groups are connected in series. A smaller battery pack of 12 kWh has a 28s 4p configuration of the same cells, for the same pack voltage but only two-thirds of the capacity. Arcimoto developed their own interconnect system for their batteries. The battery is capable of accepting level 2 charging; however, the company plans on making their fleet vehicles handle higher charging rates in the future.

=== Software ===
Arcimoto vehicles will have custom software in the vehicle, along with a mobile application.

Arcimotos will be subject to over-the-air updates. Updates can affect all components, including the display and the handling characteristics.

In addition to controlling driving dynamics, the mobile application will control how the vehicle behaves. For example, golf courses may construct geofences which will limit the top speed of an FUV while the passengers are golfing.

The company also plans to use the application to enable Arcimoto owners to rent their vehicle to others.

=== Fun Utility Vehicle, FUV ===
The company's first vehicle, the Fun Utility Vehicle, or FUV, is a tandem two-seat three wheeled electric motorcycle with an EPA-rated range of 102 city miles per charge The vehicle will have a fuel economy of 173.7 MPGe at city driving speeds. The FUV is freeway capable, with a maximum speed of 75 mph (121 km/h). The company officially launched production and delivery of the retail Fun Utility Vehicle on September 19, 2019.

=== Modular Utility Vehicle, MUV ===
The Modular Utility Vehicle, or MUV (pronounced "M-U-V" or "Move") is the fifth variant of the FUV. Cutting the roll-cage off at the B-pillar, ditching the rear seat, and adding a flatbed and optional storage box in its place, the MUV is planned to serve the general utility, warehouse, agricultural, and last-mile delivery markets. It reportedly gets up to 173.7MPGe (102 miles, city) and can reach speeds up to 75 mph.

The MUV features a powder-coated steel headache rack at the B-pillar, protecting the driver from shifting loads and adding additional tie-down locations. The upper brake light has also moved from the typical C-pillar location (not present on the MUV) to the B-pillar.

The steel flatbed attaches to the chassis at the far rear and bottom of the B-pillar. It retains the overall package size of the FUV platform and provides over 30x30" on its surface for mounting. It features slots and tie-downs for securing official side rails and a tail-gate, an official steel storage box, custom solutions, or nothing at all. It does not have towing capabilities and its weight capacity has yet to be tested.

The optional steel storage box can be assembled to the flatbed with bolts in less than 10 minutes. Arcimoto say it is fully weatherproof, can be entirely wrapped in custom vinyl, features over 25 cubic feet of internal storage, and includes a large, locking door on the side. The door has an internal safety release, swings outward toward the driver, and was designed in such a way that it could be ordered on the left, right, or both sides of the box for various customer applications. An internal dome light and optional shelves lie inside. A brake light was also added at its top-rear as when installed, the storage box blocks the main brake light at the top of the B-pillar.

The features of the MUV (headache rack, flatbed, and storage box) were designed by Arcimoto mechanical engineers in 2022/2023. Despite only prototypes ever being made and minimal testing ever being conducted (due to mass company layoffs), the MUV remains a flagship product in the company's advertising, displayed front-and-center on their website. A promotional video was made in 2023 as well, showing off a nearly-complete prototype.

=== Rapid Responder ===
The Rapid Responder variant is built for emergency services and security professionals. Due to its smaller footprint compared to traditional emergency vehicles, the Rapid Responder can arrive at the scene of an incident more quickly and easily. The core of the Rapid Responder is an FUV with a roof rack available to store equipment and is outfitted with emergency flashing lights, including forward facing lights for increased visibility. The Rapid Responder also comes with a siren and 360-degree scene lights situated around the vehicle.

Arcimoto is conducting pilot programs of the Rapid Responder with the City of Eugene, the Eugene Springfield Fire Department, and the city of Eastvale, California.

=== Deliverator ===
The Deliverator is built for businesses who offer local and last-mile delivery to their customers. This variant comes with only one seat. The back seat is replaced by an extra-large cargo area that is accessible by a door on the right side (when seated in the vehicle). The Deliverator offers a top speed of 75 mph, 102 city miles of range, carrying capacity of 350 pounds, and 28 claimed cubic feet of storage, enabling deliveries of parcels.

Arcimoto is conducting pilot programs with companies and organizations around the US. The production version of the Deliverator will be ready by the end of 2020. Production is expected to ramp up to volume production during 2021.

=== Roadster ===
This FUV variant features no roof or roll cage, similar to a three-wheeled motorcycle. According to the company, removing the roof reduces the vehicle's weight by about 100 pounds, although this has not been independently verified. The seats are being developed by Corbin-Pacific while the windshield is being developed by National Cycle. Corbin-Pacific and National Cycle also manufacture the seats, windshield and roof for the FUV, Rapid Responder, and Deliverator. Pricing starts at $23,900 and will begin production in Q2 2021. Finalized specs have not been announced for the Roadster.

=== Cameo ===
The Cameo is the fourth variant of the Arcimoto platform that is specifically designed for filming applications. The passenger seat and storage compartment is replaced with a rear-facing seat. This configuration provides free range of motion for a cameraperson to film.

== Executives ==
- Mark Frohnmayer, Founder, President: Mark grew up in Eugene, Oregon before attending the University of California, Berkeley. He graduated in 1996 with degrees in electrical engineering and computer science. Has past experience is in software development with Dynamix and his own company GarageGames. Arcimoto's formation was funded with the Frohnmayer's share of the sale of GarageGames to IAC.

== See also ==
- List of companies based in Oregon
- List of motorized trikes
