= Rob Richie =

American political activist (born 1962)

Robert Richie
- Born: 1962 (age 63–64)
- Education: Haverford College
- Known for: President and CEO of FairVote

Robert Richie (born 1962) is an American political activist who was the president and CEO of FairVote, a non-profit organization that researches and advocates election reforms. Richie directed FairVote from its founding in 1992 until 2023, when he transitioned into the role of senior advisor.

== Early life and education ==
Born in Washington, D.C., Richie graduated from Haverford College with a B.A. in philosophy in 1987. He worked for three congressional campaigns in Washington state and non-profit organizations in Washington and the District of Columbia. He is married and has three children.

== Career ==
Richie co-founded FairVote and became its first executive director in 1992. He has addressed the Voting Section of the U. S. Department of Justice, the Texas Commission on Judicial Efficiency, the Lincoln Day dinners of the Alaska Republican Party in Juneau and Anchorage, and the annual conventions of the American Political Science Association, National Association of Counties, Unitarian Universalism, and National Conference of State Legislatures.

Richie has worked with congressional staff in writing legislation, including the States' Choice of Voting Systems Act (1999) and Bipartisan Federal Elections Review Act (2001). He testified in special sessions before charter commissions in Nassau County (New York), Miami Beach (Florida), Cincinnati (Ohio), Austin (Texas), and Detroit (Michigan) and before state legislative committees in Alaska, Vermont, Virginia, and Washington.
