= Unified primary =

Single-winner electoral system

A unified primary (or top-2 approval+runoff) is an electoral system for narrowing the field of candidates for a single-winner election, similar to a nonpartisan blanket primary, but using approval voting for the first round, advancing the top-two candidates, allowing voters to confirm the majority-supported candidate in the general election.

== Comparison to other primary systems ==
In the US, most primary elections are party-specific: voters select a political party, either as part of the voter registration process or at the ballot box, and may vote only for candidates sharing that same party affiliation. These primary systems use plurality voting, where each voter may express a preference for one candidate per office. The candidate in each party receiving the most votes advances to the general election. Voters not affiliated with a major political party may or may not be able to participate in these primary elections, depending on jurisdictional rules, and candidates not affiliated with a major political party may be nominated to the general election by other processes such as minor party conventions or petition.

The non-partisan blanket primary (a.k.a. "jungle primary" or top-two primary) is a single primary election in which all voters may participate, and all candidates appear on the same ballot, regardless of party affiliation or lack of party affiliation. The top two most-voted candidates (even if members of the same party) will appear in the general election. This is intended to allow non-partisan voters and candidates to participate, and to allow more moderate nominees in the general election (since voters from both sides of the spectrum can vote for them). However, the non-partisan blanket primary still only allows voters a single choice per office, and is therefore prone to the spoiler effect, where candidates espousing similar ideologies split votes, helping candidates with opposing ideologies (but fewer candidates) to win.

Like a blanket primary, the unified primary has only one primary election, in which all voters participate, and all candidates appear on a single ballot regardless of political party affiliation. Unlike a blanket primary, the unified primary uses approval voting in the first round, in which voters may express support for any number of favored candidates, which is intended to eliminate vote splitting and spoilers (since voters can support a partisan favorite and a moderate). The top two most-approved candidates will appear in the general election.

== Analysis ==
Top-two approval primary	Runoff

Proponents argue that the Unified Primary system will increase voter choice by allowing all voters to participate equally in all stages of the election process, by allowing voters to express support for more than a single candidate, and by allowing all candidates to compete in a uniform election process, regardless of political party affiliation or lack of affiliation.

In contrast, FairVote, a national election reform non-profit that advocates instant-runoff voting, theorized that it is likely that general election races would have two finalists from the same major party in districts where a majority of voters affiliate with that party, and thereby reduce voter choice in the election that has statistically higher turnout than current primary elections.

Unlike single-round Approval voting, the Approval+Runoff method fails independence of clones, because any time the second-most approved candidate wins the runoff, if a clone of the most-approved candidate is introduced, then the runoff will be only between the most-approved candidate and their clone, preventing the second-most approved candidate and any of their clones from winning.

== Usage ==
As of 2024, the only city in the United States using a unified primary for government office is St. Louis.

=== St. Louis ===
The city of St. Louis has been using the unified primary since their mayoral election held in March 2021, having survived two repeal attempts. Although such a system is prohibited in other parts of Missouri after passage of 2024 Missouri Amendment 7 in November 2024, St. Louis is exempted because it enacted their system in 2020, prior to Amendment 7's passage.

==== STL Approves ====
The STL Approves campaign sought to adopt the unified primary (though they refer to it simply as "approval voting") in St. Louis city elections (Mayor, Comptroller, President of the Board of Aldermen, and Alderman). Originally called St. Louisans for Ranked Choice Voting, the campaign switched to advocating for approval+runoff, primarily due to learning that St. Louis and St. Louis County voting machines are incompatible with IRV.

In April 2020 they gathered enough signatures to qualify for the ballot as "Proposition D". Polling showed more than 70% support for the measure, with majority support among all demographic groups and parties. On election day, the initiative was successfully passed with 68% of the vote, thus becoming the first United States city and jurisdiction to adopt it.

==== 2021 election ====
The first top-two approval primary was held on March 2, 2021, with a 44,571 (22.14%) primary voter turnout. The April 6, 2021 runoff turnout was 57,918 (28.8%). The 2021 St. Louis mayoral election had 4 candidates, three Democrats and one Republican. The average voter supported 1.56 candidates, with the top candidate gaining 57.0%, runner up 46.3%.

March 2, 2021 Primary Election Results
	Tishaura Jones	Cara Spencer	Lewis E. Reed	Andrew Jones
Party preference:	Democratic Party	Democratic Party	Democratic Party	Republican Party
Votes of approval:	25,388	20,659	17,186	6,428
Approval percentage:	56.96%	46.35%	38.56%	14.42%
Total Vote Cards Cast: 44,571

In the old closed primary system, there would have been a Democratic party primary with 3 candidates, and a Republican party primary with 1 candidate, with the top Democrat and top Republican advancing to the general election. With Saint Louis being a Democrat-majority city, the top-two approval primary helps two Democrats rise and compete head-to-head in the runoff, as well as allowing Republican voters a say on which Democrat wins. Democrat candidates have some incentive to present themselves as a moderate to gain Republican votes. Without a party primary Republicans lose access to consolidate under a single candidates, so they must agree on a single candidate before the primary to have any chance of making the top-two.

==== 2022 repeal attempt ====
While voter support for the approval voting ballot measure was high, a majority of the city's aldermen opposed it, and in January 2022, they attempted to repeal it and return to partisan primaries with two or three rounds of runoff voting. Repealing a voter initiative requires a two-thirds majority of aldermen support, however, and the bills were not passed before another voter initiative, Proposition R, was passed with 69% support, which required that further changes to the voting system be put to a public vote.

==== 2024 repeal attempt ====
In February 2024, Ben Baker introduced legislation to ban approval and ranked-choice voting state-wide. It passed in the House on Apr 15, 2024. Note, however, that St. Louis is still allowed to use top-two approval with a runoff, and that they used the system in their 2025 mayoral election.

== Reform campaigns ==
=== Oregon ===
The use of approval voting on an open field of all candidates for partisan office as a replacement for current party-nominated primary systems was first publicly proposed in November 2011 by Mark and Jon Frohnmayer in the form of a draft ballot initiative. The text of the failed Oregon Ballot Measure 65 (2008), which would have instituted a top-two primary system, served as the foundation for the draft, which was then modified to allow voters to select as many candidates as favored for each office.

A formal petition drive to institute the Unified Primary system in Oregon began in October 2013. Petitioners completed the sponsorship phase of the initiative process by collecting more than 1,000 verified signatures from registered voters to advance the measure toward the November, 2014 ballot. The pairing "unified primary" was also advanced by Oregon's Attorney General in the draft ballot title for this initiative: "Changes Election Nomination Processes; Replaces Current Primary System With Unified Primary For All Candidates." Several variations of this measure have been filed to date: 2014 Initiative Petitions 38 and 51.

The campaign did not collect the 87,213 signatures required to get Petition 54 onto the ballot. (The "Open Primary" proposal that used plurality voting did collect enough signatures, but was defeated.)

=== Seattle ===
A 2022 ballot initiative sought to bring this system to Seattle (under the name "approval voting"). In June, volunteers for Seattle Approves had gathered the 26,000 signatures for Initiative 134 to qualify for the November ballot. The initiative would be an open primary with approval voting, followed by a top-two runoff.

The city council then had the option to adopt the initiative immediately as an ordinance, put it on the ballot for voters to approve, or reject it and substitute it with a similar measure. They chose the latter, with Andrew Lewis announcing a bill to put a two-round variant of instant-runoff voting on the ballot to compete against the initiative (under the name "ranked choice voting"), with support from FairVote. Because Seattle law requires a top-two runoff, this system is actually an instant-runoff primary followed by a top-two runoff.

In the end, the ballot contained two questions, the first of which asked voters if they wanted to change the voting system at all, and the second of which asked voters to support either Approval (1A) or Ranked Choice (1B). Question 1 narrowly passed, with 51% support, while the more well-known RCV was favored in Question 2, with 76% support.
