= Fuu =

Fuu may refer to:

- Furu language
- Fuu Hououji, a character in Magic Knight Rayearth
- Fuu, a character in Samurai Champloo
- Fuu (kickboxer)
