= Expeditionary energy economics =

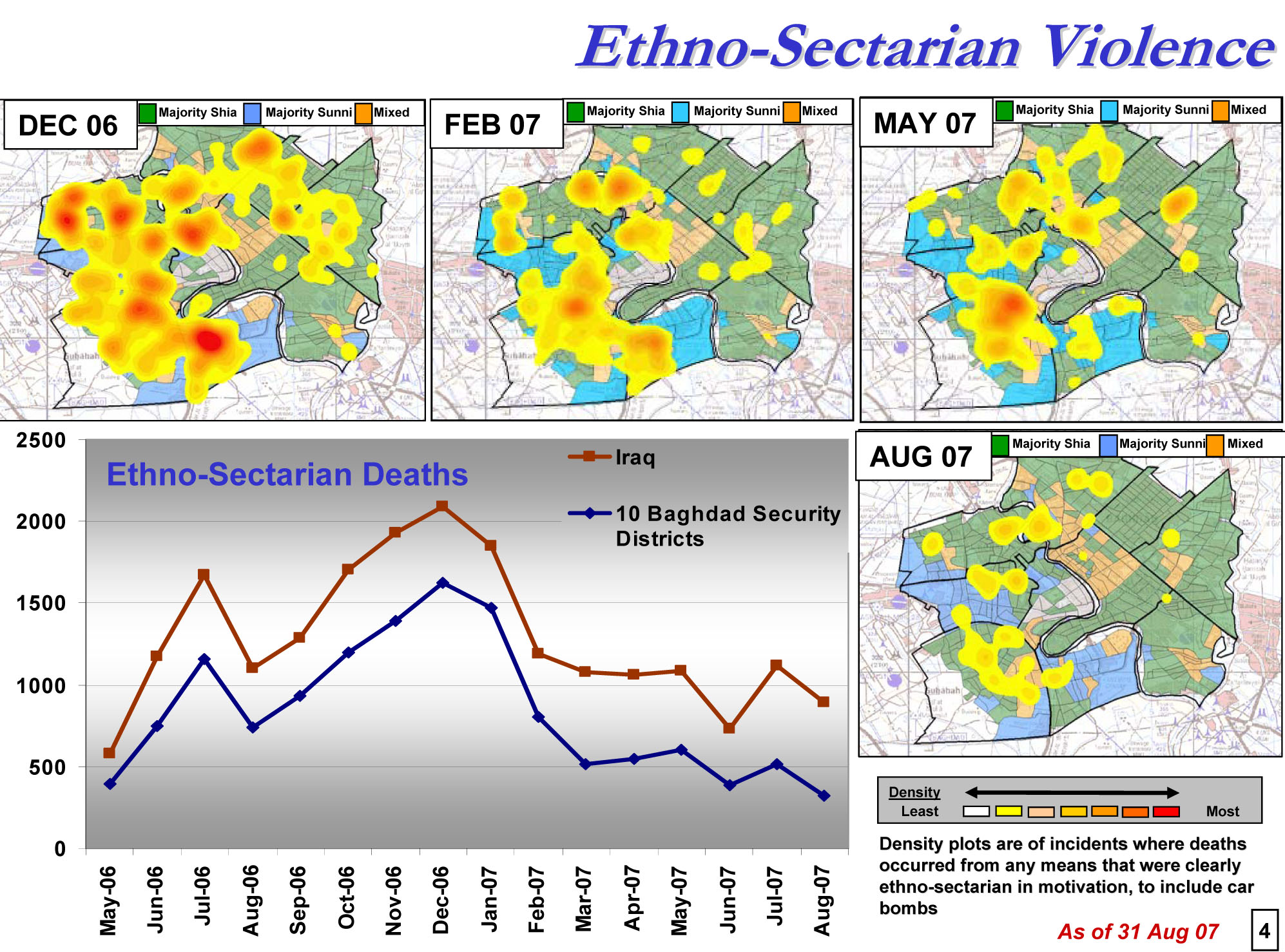
The success of the Iraq War troop surge of 2007 on decreasing Ethno-Sectarian violence in Baghdad.

Expeditionary energy economics (e3) is an emerging field of energy economics that addresses energy management in the military expeditionary environment or as part of the disaster response stage of the emergency management cycle. The term was first introduced in 2018 in an article by U.S. Army Major Alexander Thymmons, a research fellow within the Strategic Analysis Department of the NATO Energy Security Center of excellence in Vilnius, Lithuania. Major Thymmons proposed that the successful megacity counterinsurgency (COIN) campaigns of the twenty-first century will depend on fast solutions to critical energy infrastructure (CEI) vulnerabilities within individual communities. The practice of energy management in the military expeditionary environment (EMMEE) is not new. The US Marine Corps has an Expeditionary Energy Office, and NATO uses the new field to test the applicability and value of a draft military adaptation of ISO 50001:2011 (Energy management systems – Requirements with guidance for use).

The successful implementation of e3 theory requires that COIN practitioners have a basic understanding of CEI. Thymmons proves his hypothesis with personal vignettes from his time as an infantry platoon leader during the Iraq War troop surge of 2007. In Baghdad, before the 2007 surge, the unreliability of CEI created a safe haven and power base for insurgents. During the surge, however, the effects of military units promoting community based economics (CBE) and high-risk/high-impact innovation (HRH2I) as a solution to local energy supply shortages on Haifa Street were a significant increase in the standard of living, a decrease in ethno-sectarian violence, and an increase in support for the Coalition Forces. The Haifa Street case study shows that one of the most vital elements of successful megacity COIN is facilitating rapid access of the urban community to affordable and reliable energy sources—which is a matter of managing both security of CEI and security of supply.

== The role of economics and energy security in megacity COIN strategies ==
David Galula—the father of counterinsurgency theory—defined an insurgency as "a protracted struggle conducted methodically, step by step, in order to attain specific intermediate objectives leading finally to the overthrow of the existing order". A COIN campaign is then "the set of political, economic, social, military, law enforcement, civil and psychological activities with the aim to defeat insurgency and address any core grievances". The study of economic principles during COIN or disaster relief is referred as expeditionary economics. The extant understanding of expeditionary economics treats the planning and execution of state building by the military as a "three-legged strategy of invasion, stabilization or pacification, and economic reconstruction," which is "the ultimate objective of counterinsurgency (COIN) campaigns". This is in line with NATO's preferred COIN operational approach—Clear, Hold, and Build (CHB)—which “encompasses offensive, defensive, stability and enabling activities”.

This map shows the global distribution of top 400 "urban areas" with at least 1,000,000 inhabitants in 2006.

The NATO doctrine states that "the effective ‘offensive’ operation in COIN is one that takes from the insurgent what he cannot afford to lose—control of the population. ... Protecting the people is the mission. The conflict will be won by persuading the population, not by destroying the enemy". For this reason, CHB is the joint civil-military action—taken by NATO, Host Nation, and civil actors—which places the restoration of basic services and infrastructure before the neutralization of hostile groups. In the context of megacities in the twenty-first century, which are dependent on glocal (global/local) energy systems, this means that the offensive operation in COIN is dependent on EMMEE and cannot be accomplished in the absence of energy security. The US Stability joint publication articulates that "energy is clearly a priority" to achieve security during COIN. This implies that the implementation of quick solutions to CEI vulnerabilities takes precedence over long-term CEI development.

== See also ==
- Energy economics
- Entrepreneurial economics
- Expeditionary economics
- Expeditionary warfare
- Experimental economics
- Urban warfare
