= Expeditionary economics =

Field of economics

Expeditionary economics is an emerging field of economic enquiry that focuses on the rebuilding and reconstructing of economies in post-conflict nations and providing support to disaster-struck nations.

The term was introduced in 2010 in an essay by Carl Schramm, the former president and CEO of the Ewing Marion Kauffman Foundation. It focuses on the need for good economic planning on the part of developed nations to help prevent the creation of failed states. It also emphasizes the need for the structuring on new firms to rebuild national economies.

Since then, the theory has been used by the U.S. Government and the U.S. Army to restructure the economies of countries such as Iraq and Afghanistan and helping Haiti after its severe earthquake. Its aim is to provide economic stabilization and support the counterinsurgency tactics in such nations.

== History and theory ==
Expeditionary economics and armies must focus on infusing entrepreneurship and "messy capitalism" which prevails in the U.S. He describes the strategy adopted by economists to quickly establish a trajectory toward economic growth with the formation of firms that can generate rapid growth in revenue and employment. He also asks the U.S. Army to "treat economic reconstruction as part of any successful three-legged strategy of invasion, stabilization or pacification, and economic reconstruction."

The Pentagon has confirmed that it has applied the theory as a "weapon" to stabilize operations in countries with past conflict such as Iraq and Afghanistan and has planned various measures which will come into effect just as the army leaves the countries. With special reference to Iran and Afghanistan, reports show that significant resources have been dedicated to such efforts over the past decade, with hundreds of billions of dollars spent in the two countries. The theory rests to a huge extent on the dynamism of new firms, which constantly introduce innovations into the economy. The U.S Government's recent engagements have made it appreciate that post-conflict economic reconstruction must become a core competence of the U.S. military. However, their actions do not present any such appreciation.

== Criticism ==
There has been widespread criticism of the theory, particularly on the point that it should be carried out by the invading army. Many economists questioned the relative chances of its application by other post-conflict and military nations. There have also been questions on whether the U.S. Army should be held liable or whether the objectives should be outsourced to private-sector enterprises or to other departments of the U.S. Government. The U.S. Army Stability Operations field manual (published in 2009) offers no relevant guidance on what role economic development should play in the United States' post conflict strategy or how to help build dynamic, growth-oriented economies. That being said, NATO's preferred COIN operational approach—Clear, Hold, and Build (CHB)—"encompasses offensive, defensive, stability and enabling activities", which apply the principles of expeditionary economics.

== See also ==
- Carl Schramm
- Entrepreneurial economics
- Expeditionary energy economics
- Experimental economics
- U.S. Army

== Bibliography ==
- Nanto, Dick K. and National Security: Issues and Implications for U. S. Policy. DAINE Publishing House. Pg 4
- Milonakis, Dimitris; Fine, Ben. From Political Economy to Economics: Method, the social and the historical in the evolution of economic theory. Pg 306
