= Institutional failure =

Institutional failure may refer to:

- Government failure
- Market failure
