= Public Education Center =

The Public Education Center (PEC) is a nonpartisan, nonprofit investigative journalism organization based in Washington, DC. Through its National Security News Service (NSNS) and Natural Resources News Service (NRNS), PEC employs career investigative journalists to develop nationally significant, general-interest news stories that would otherwise be ignored by the mainstream media and places them in targeted commercial media.

NSNS covers topics such as weapons of mass destruction, nuclear issues, conventional arms, the intelligence community, terrorism, and government waste, fraud, and secrecy. NRNS focuses on such topics as air and water pollution, habitat protection and reclamation, public land management, and environmental regulation.

Reporters for PEC develop these investigative stories by locating and interviewing sources and finding relevant scientific and government information, often utilizing the federal Freedom of Information Act. The organization then offers the work to the commercial media, who utilize PEC’s contacts and extensive background research to write and produce the final stories themselves.

== History ==
The Public Education Center was established in 1992 to finance and administer NSNS, which was founded by Wayne Jaquith in 1988 as a pilot project of the Council for a Livable World’s Education Fund.

== Administration ==
Joseph Trento is president of the Public Education Center.
