= Tony Luppino =

American attorney, legal scholar, and author

Anthony J. "Tony" Luppino
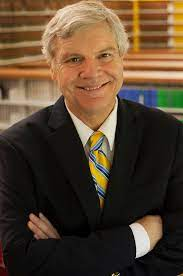

Rubey M. Hulen Professor of Law

Director, Entrepreneurship Programs at UMKC

Personal details
- Education: Stanford University School of Law
- Profession: Professor of law
- Website: law.umkc.edu/profiles/faculty-directory/anthony-j-luppino.html

Anthony J. “Tony” Luppino is an American attorney, legal scholar, and author. A law professor at the University of Missouri - Kansas City School of Law since 1991, he is the Rubey M. Hulen Professor of Law and Urban Affairs, Director of Entrepreneurship Programs, and Senior Fellow with the UMKC Regnier Institute for Entrepreneurship & Innovation. He is particularly active in the areas of entrepreneurship and business law, and cross-disciplinary studies and programs connecting them.

== Early life and education ==
After graduating from South Catholic High School, Luppino earned his Bachelor of Arts from Dartmouth College, graduating magna cum laude in 1979. He was accepted to Stanford Law School, becoming an editor of the Stanford Law Review in his 2L and 3L years and receiving his J.D. degree in 1982. After law school, he was admitted to the Massachusetts Bar in 1982; moving back to Boston to join the law firm of Hedrick & Smith, practicing there from 1982 to 1986. While still practicing, he earned his LL.M. in Taxation from Boston University School of Law in 1986, resuming his editorial duties for the Boston University Journal of Tax Law as its Lead Articles Editor in 1985. He is a member of the Phi Beta Kappa fraternity.

== Private practice and academic career ==
After completing his LL.M., Tony accepted a position at the midwest law firm Brown, Koralchik and Fingersh, in Overland Park, Kansas in 1986, becoming a Partner in 1988. When the firm diverged a year later, he became a Partner in the new offshoot firm of Lewis, Rice and Fingersh in Kansas City, Missouri, where he practiced from 1989 to 1994. His final role in private practice was as a member of the Lewis, Rice and Fingersh L.C., from 1994 to 2001. His primary areas of practice were taxation, business law, partnerships, and joint ventures. Departing from private practice, Luppino turned his attention to academia and research, areas his contributions would leave a significant and indelible mark, particularly in the cross-disciplinary subjects of law and entrepreneurship.

Luppino joined the faculty of the University of Missouri, Kansas City Law School in 1994, where he taught Partnership Taxation as an adjunct faculty member until 2001. During this transition from private practice to academia, he became increasingly interested in the intersection of entrepreneurship and law. In 2001, he became full-time faculty as an associate professor, earning tenure in 2005. He joined the 2004-2005 Kauffman Entrepreneurial Faculty Scholars Program, a cross-disciplinary endeavor with faculty representatives from multiple area universities, quickly rising within the Kauffman Foundation and UMKC ranks.

== Contributions in entrepreneurship and law ==
His representation in this program led him to develop an interdisciplinary program for UMKC; its Entrepreneurship and New Venture Creation Course, the first program of its kind at the university, and the first of many entrepreneurship initiatives he would lead. Soon after, he helped develop and launch the entrepreneurial law website eshiplaw.com, serving as co-founder, board member, and currently, lead editor. In 2010, Luppino was the principal organizer of a new interdisciplinary program for the United States Association for Small Business & Entrepreneurship (USASBE), the leading organization in the country for entrepreneurship research and education. Luppino became the initial chair of USASBE’s Law & Entrepreneurship Special Interest Group for the 2010-2011 year, and continues to serve as an instructor, director, and advisor.

His efforts to connect and work with faculty, administrators, and stakeholders within the legal, entrepreneurship, and business communities have produced and aided multiple new courses, competitions, studies, and other interdisciplinary programs, both at the University of Missouri System of schools, and the broader Kansas City community. This includes UMKC’s E-Scholars program, the Regnier Venture Creation Challenge, the UM system E-Ship competition, the Missouri P3 Broadband competition, VentureLab, an IP collaboration with the KU Med School, among others.

Since 2006, Luppino has focused on bringing together faculty from different departments at UMKC to teach entrepreneurship to law, business, and technology students, and on spurring students to create innovative solutions to challenges faced by the local community. With funding from the Kauffman Foundation and support from other academics globally, he created the Legal Technology Laboratory, a consortium focused on identifying opportunities for technical solutions in the business and civic sectors. On February 3, 2017, Luppino was honored as UM System Entrepreneurship Educator of the Year. In 2022, Luppino co-created a competition centered on providing affordable access to high-speed Internet to residents and businesses in Northwestern Missouri. According to Luppino, the competition “provided an opportunity for the students to demonstrate their knowledge, talents and teamwork in a service-learning experience focused on a critically important subject.”

== Personal life ==
Tony Luppino continues to be an avid Red Sox baseball fan, currently living in Kansas City, Missouri with his wife, Janet, and their two children.

== Awards and titles ==
- Luppino is currently the Rubey M. Hulen Professor of Law and Urban Affairs, Director of Entrepreneurship Programs, and Senior Fellow with the UMKC Regnier Institute for Entrepreneurship & Innovation
- Director of Entrepreneurship Programs at the UMKC School of Law
- Founder, Director and Principal Grant Investigator for the Legal Tech Lab
- Founder and Chair, USASBE Law and Entrepreneurship Professional Special Interest Group
- Missouri center for transportation innovation board member
- Lead editor for eshiplaw.org
- 2020: 2020 Top Legal innovations: Anthony Luppino
- 2019: the UMKC Trustees Leo E. Morton Community Service Award
- 2018: the UM System President's (Faculty) Award forEconomic Development
- 2017: inaugural recipient of the University of Missouri System Entrepreneurship Educator of the Year Award
- 2010: Marvin Lewis Rich Faculty Scholar Award
- 2005: Law Alumni Association Outstanding Professor Award
- 2004-2005: Kauffman Entrepreneurial Faculty Scholar
- 2004: Elmer F. Pierson Excellence in Teaching Award
- 2003-2004: Daniel L. Brenner Faculty Publishing Award

== Selected works ==
- Community Economic Development Is Access to Justice, Journal of Affordable Housing Volume 27, Number 3 2019, UCLA School of Law, Public Law Research Paper No. 19-19, Albany Law School Research Paper No. 5 for 2019-2020
- ADVANCES IN ENTREPRENEURSHIP, FIRM EMERGENCE AND GROWTH, (co-author, 2017).
- Some Key Things U.S. Entrepreneurs Need to Know About the Law and Lawyers, 46 Texas Journal of Business Law 155 (2016)
- How Law Schools Can and Should be Involved in Building Ecosystems that Foster Innovation, Entrepreneurship and Growth (Kauffman Foundation Conference Paper, 2015)
- Producing Better Mileage: Advancing the Design and Usefulness of Hybrid Vehicles for Social
- Business Ventures, 33 Quinnipiac L. Rev. 235 (co-author, 2015)
- Incubating Solo and Small Law Firm Entrepreneurs, The Ohio State Business and Entrepreneurial Law Journal (online ed., 2014)
- HOW TO BE YOUR OWN LAWYER... WITHOUT BEING A FOOL: A PRACTICAL GUIDE FOR THE ENTREPRENEUR WHO WANTS TO
- SAVE TIME AND MONEY THROUGH INFORMED SELF-HELP, PREPARATION, AND THE EFFICIENT USE OF LEGAL COUNSEL (2014, co-authored with Thomas C. Brown).
- Co-editor (and co-author of Introduction) with Robert Litan, Director of Research at Bloomberg Government, Edward Elgar Publishing Book/Research Collection on LAW AND ENTREPRENEURSHIP (2013)
- The Value of Lawyers as Members of Entrepreneurial Teams; HANDBOOK ON LAW, INNOVATION AND GROWTH (co-author, 2011)
- A Little of This, A Little of That: Potential Effects on Entrepreneurship of the McCain and Obama Tax Proposals, 31 W. New Eng. L. Rev. 717 (2009)
- Minding More Than Our Own Business: Educating Entrepreneurial Lawyers Through Law School-Business School Collaborations, 30 W. NEW ENG. L. REV. 151 (2007)
- Multidisciplinary Business Planning Firms: Expanding the Regulatory Tent Without Creating A Circus, 35 SETON HALL L. REV. 109 (2004)
- Stopping the Enron End-Runs and Other Trick Plays: The Book-Tax Accounting Conformity Defense, COLUM. BUS. L. REV. 35 (2003)
