= Scott Shane (professor) =

Entrepreneurship scholar

- Born: Scott Andrew Shane; April 14, 1964 (age 62)
- Education: Brown University; Georgetown University; Wharton School of the University of Pennsylvania
- Spouse: Lynne Schneider
- Children: Hannah • Ryan
- Awards: Global Award for Entrepreneurship Research (2009)
- Scientific career
- Fields: Entrepreneurial studies
- Institutions: Case Western Reserve University
- Thesis: Cultural differences in innovation championing strategies (1992)
- Doctoral advisor: Sankaran Venkataraman

Scott Andrew Shane (born April 14, 1964) is the A. Malachi Mixon III Professor of Entrepreneurial Studies and professor of economics at Case Western Reserve University. He has written over sixty academic papers on entrepreneurship, as well as writing or editing ten books on the subject. His research has focused on many aspects of entrepreneurship, including technology entrepreneurship and venture finance, as well as using twin studies to explore the genetic basis of entrepreneurial behaviors.

== Honors and awards ==
Shane's books have received the Best Business Book Award, the Best Small Business Book Award, and Taiwan's Golden Book Award. Shane himself received the Global Award for Entrepreneurship Research in 2009, and in 2016, he was recognized as the most influential entrepreneurship scholar from 2000 to 2015 by the New England Journal of Entrepreneurship. In 2017, he was one of five winners of Case Western Reserve University's Faculty Distinguished Research Award.
