= Charles Magnus =

Charles Magnus (16 March 1826 – 3 May 1900) was a printing entrepreneur, whose business was based in New York, NY. He was known for his colour lithographs of city views, song sheets, maps and patriotic illustrations for stationery and covers during the American Civil War.

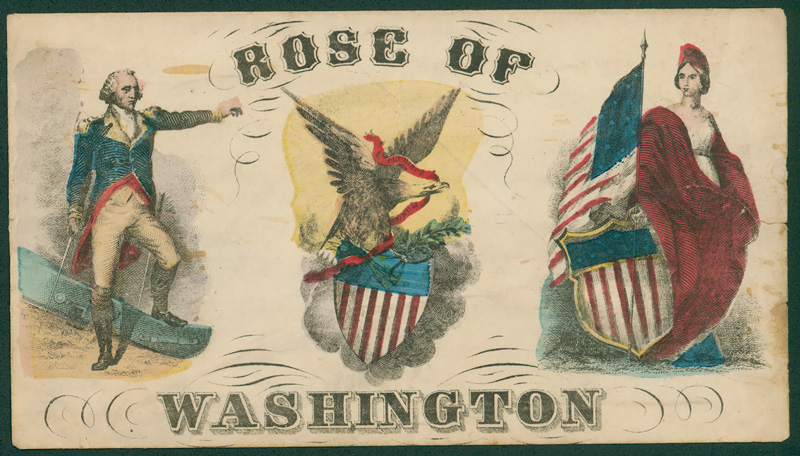
Envelope illustration published by Charles Magnus

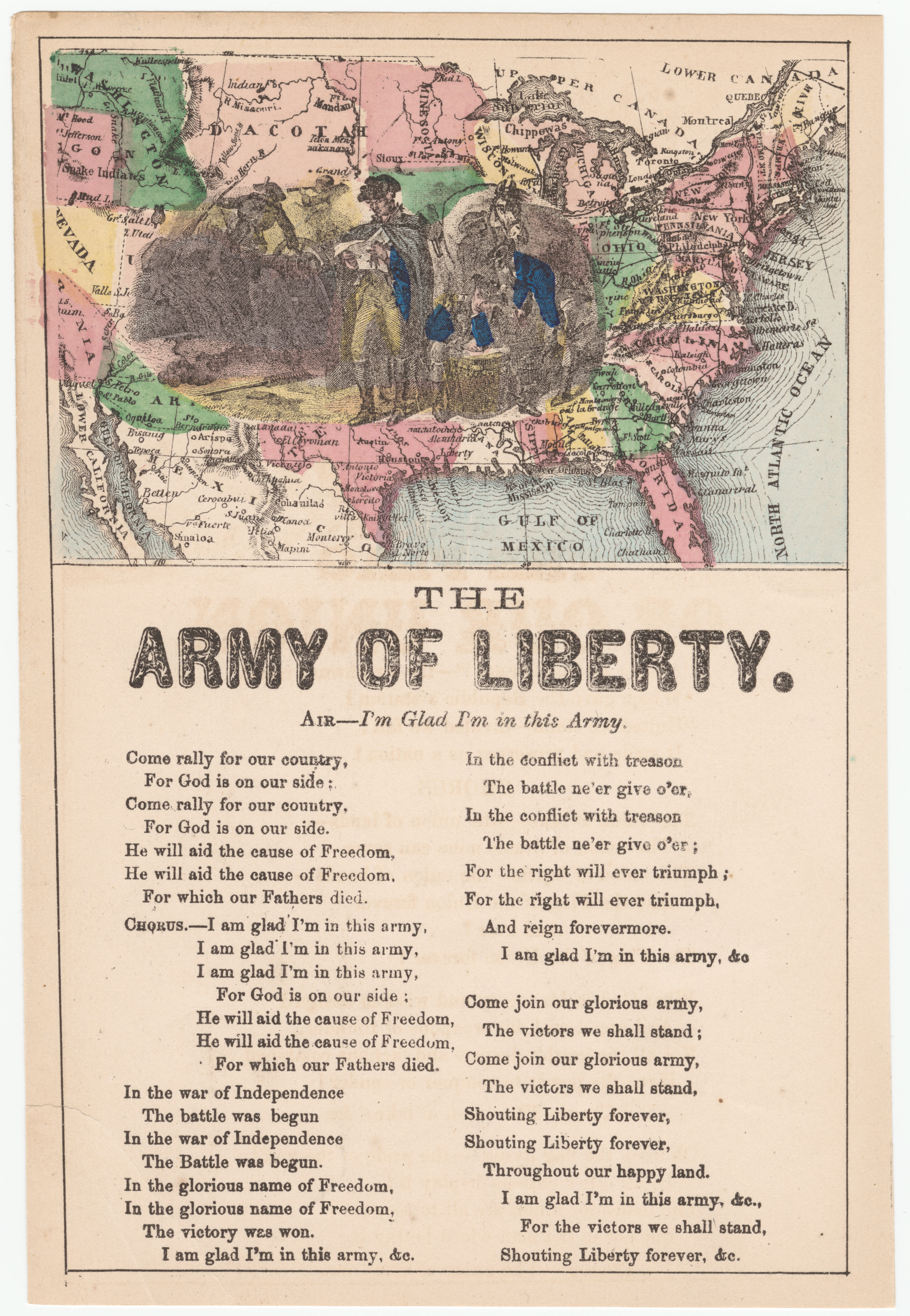
Charles Magnus' map, named "The Army of Liberty" from 1863, showing the U.S. and a historical image of Washington used to promote a civil war song for Northern soldiers

== Early history ==
Charles Magnus was born Julian Carl Magnus in Elberfeldt, Germany in 1826. His early career in Germany included sales for a silk firm. His family emigrated to New York City in the late 1840s presumably as a result of their opposition to Emperor Frederick William IV. He and his brother Carl Emil founded the weekly German-language newspaper "Deutsche Schnellposte", which was later sold. He married Christina Koerner, a native of Munich, Germany, in 1854. They had at least four children.

== Lithographic work ==
After "Schnellposte" was sold, Magnus entered the publishing business as a mapmaker.

During the Civil War, he made a specialty of maps of the battlefields, with pictures made on the battlefields printed on the margins. He visited the scenes of many battles in order to secure these pictures. He was one of the very few persons to whom passes were issued giving permission to visit ALL the Union Camps.

Bird's-eye views of North American cities, issued in large folio sizes, became popular in the mid-nineteenth century. Publishers, such as Charles Magnus, recognized a market for smaller octavo sized views, issued both as prints for framing and as illustrations on stationery. He employed lithographic transfers from engraved plates. Some were hand-colored.

Magnus best-known and most extensive work is in the illustration of Civil War patriotic covers. His covers are among the most popular among collectors because of their print quality, "achieved by the utilization of steel, copper, and stone engraved plates and the old-world workmanship applied in hand or stencil coloring processes"

Magnus' color selection also deserves mention. Single color printings include bronze, silver, black and other, not commonly used colors. Multicolor printings were done by hand or by stencil. In using the stencil process, a color composition model was placed in front of his employees, each working with one color only. The more elaborate envelopes often were hand-colored by Magnus himself. Magnus was a good colorist. Color tones achieved by him were invariably rich and brilliant, thanks to his ability to exploit the full potential of his top quality permanent inks.

Magnus was not an original designer. He adapted designs from a variety of published items, including bank notes, and rarely needed to credit an artist. For every design, he created many variations.

Magnus' Civil War patriotic designs run the gamut from portraits of Washington and Lincoln to flags, females, and shields. They include a birds' eye view of Alexandria, Va. (as made from a map), numerous views of Civil War camps and scenes, hospitals, U.S. cities, battle scenes, naval scenes, eagles, states, battle campaign maps, and the famous Roses of Washington.

Altogether, Magnus produced about 1,000 varieties of printing, as compared to about 7,500 produced by the then most popular Currier and Ives. While Currier's work represented substantial artistic creation, Magnus' excels with his superior printing technique.
