= China trade =

China trade may refer to

- History of trade of the People's Republic of China
- History of trade of the Republic of China (1949-present)
- Economy of the People's Republic of China
- Economy of the Republic of China
- Economic history of China (pre-1911)
- Economic history of China (1912–1949)
- Old China Trade, the commerce between China and the United States in the late 18th and early 19th century
- China Trade, a novel by S. J. Rozan
