= Michael McCullough (entrepreneur) =

American physician and businessman

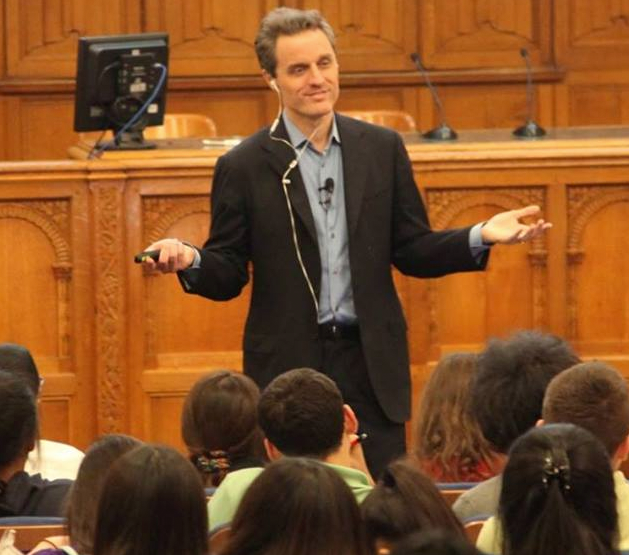
- McCullough speaking at Yale
- Born: Oregon, U.S.
- Education: Stanford University, Oxford University, UCSF
- Occupations: Entrepreneur, investor and physician
- Known for: QuestBridge, HeartFlow
- Medical career
- Field: Emergency room medicine
- Institutions: UCSF Medical Center, Stanford Medical School
- Sub-specialties: Emergency medicine, trauma

Michael McCullough is an American investor in healthcare and life science companies, social entrepreneur, and emergency room doctor. He was a Rhodes Scholar. He lives in Palo Alto, California.

== Early life and education ==
Raised in rural Oregon, McCullough was born 8 weeks prematurely and suffered a brain hemorrhage which was undiagnosed for nine years resulting in hydrocephalus, severe headaches, and a speech impediment that was corrected with brain surgery at age 10. Despite this, at age 6 he played chess against chess master Arthur Dake in a public tournament. Following the brain surgery, McCullough learned to use biofeedback and meditation techniques to regain the ability to speak fluently. At 17, he served on the Oregon Board of Education where he represented the K-12 students in Oregon and helped co-author Oregon's Action Plan For Excellence in Education, state graduation requirements and other policy. To better control his stuttering, McCullough used different accents for public speaking, teaching, and stand-up comedy, which he also used to support his way through college and medical school.

McCullough received his undergraduate degree in Human Biology and Neuroscience from Stanford University in 1989. He dropped out several times to earn money to pay the tuition. He met David Packard, whose Packard Foundation subsequently supported his early social entrepreneurship. He graduated Phi Beta Kappa from Stanford and was awarded the Dean's award for public service in honor of his establishment and directorship of the Stanford Medical Youth Science Program, which later evolved into the QuestBridge organization.

McCullough was awarded a Rhodes scholarship and travelled to England to study Philosophy, Politics and Economics at Balliol College, Oxford University while concurrently studying diagnostic neuro-imaging at the John Radcliffe Hospital. Following the completion of his master's degree at Oxford, he enrolled in medical school at the University of California, San Francisco (UCSF) School of Medicine in 1992 where he was awarded the UCSF Chancellor's and Burbridge awards for public service. He graduated with an MD in 1996 and completed a surgical residency in Emergency Medicine at Stanford Hospital.

== Career ==
McCullough was an Entrepreneur in Residence at Greylock Partners, a co-founder and partner at Headwaters Capital Partners, and a co-founder at Capricorn Healthcare and Special Opportunities (CHSO). He is the founder of the BrainMind Summit and BrainMind organization.

McCullough works as a consultant to venture capital funds on life science, impact, and education focused investments at Redpoint, NanoDimension, and Venrock. He has been an angel investor of and/or on the founding board of a number of companies. McCullough was a founding board member at 2U Inc (NAS: TWOU). He has also worked as a board member at the Dalai Lama Foundation, Metabiota, KaeMe, and Zipongo. He was a founder and President of RegenMed Systems.

In 2009, McCullough was elected as a venture fellow at the Kauffman Fellows Program and then as a Kauffman Fellows mentor in 2015.

=== Social entrepreneurship ===
McCullough is a co-founder of QuestBridge, a non-profit NGO that places low-income students into US colleges with financial aid. This organization evolved from the Stanford Medical Youth Science Program that McCullough founded as an undergraduate and gives out approximately $1.2 billion in financial aid annually to place around 3,000 students a year in 40 universities including Stanford, Yale, MIT, Amherst, and Caltech.

McCullough was a founder of the Stanford Youth Environmental Science Program (SYESP), the Quest Scholars Program and the Stanford Medical Youth Science Program (SMYSP). He is a co-founder of the Be A Good Doctor non-profit incubator at Stanford., which he started while he was a surgical resident McCullough co-founded KaeMe, a non-profit organization that works to reunite children living in orphanages in Ghana with their families, S.C.O.P.E., an internship program that places pre-medical students into emergency department volunteer positions. Other Be A Good Doctor organizations that McCullough helped to found include the Courage Project and Happiness Science.

McCullough was elected an Ashoka Fellow in 2004 and was named a top American social entrepreneur in 2006 for-profit entrepreneurship and investing.

=== Medical career ===
McCullough was a part-time assistant clinical professor of emergency medicine for 22 years at the University of California, San Francisco (UCSF) campus in Fresno. He worked as the emergency doctor for the Dalai Lama and his entourage during several tours of California between 2009 and 2011.

McCullough is a co-founder of clinical internships in Dharamshala (the India Clinical Internship), Honduras (the Roatan Clinical and Public Health Internship), and Nepal (the Nepal Clinical Internship).

McCullough has co-authored academic articles and has spoken on his work, impact investing, compassion, and the human mind.
