= Trish Costello =

American entrepreneur and investor

- Born: Patricia Costello; Pittsburg, Kansas
- Occupation: Entrepreneur
- Writing career
- Subject: Entrepreneurship
- Website: www.portfolia.com

Trish Costello (born Patricia Costello) is a Silicon Valley–based entrepreneur and investor. She is the Founder and CEO of Portfolia, a collaborative equity investing platform. She was named as one of the 100 Most Intriguing Entrepreneurs of 2014 by Goldman Sachs and Top Ten Women to Watch in Tech in 2015 by Inc magazine. She is recognized internationally for her pioneering work in educating and preparing venture capital investment partners, through the Kauffman Fellows Program. As the founding CEO and CEO Emeritus of the Center for Venture Education, she led the Kauffman Fellows Program for its first ten years. Costello was on the start-up team of the Kauffman Foundation's entrepreneurship center, where for eight years she directed its efforts in venture capital, angel investing, entrepreneur support programs, and programming to accelerate high potential women entrepreneurs. She played a leading role nationally in obtaining greater financial equity investments in women's businesses and in funding initiatives supporting high-growth women entrepreneurs.

Costello continues to serve as President of CVE Capital Corp, a holding company affiliated with a venture capital fund of funds created to endow the Kauffman Fellows Program. Her prior experience includes Directing the Arthur M. Blank Center for Entrepreneurship at Babson College, developing small business products and marketing strategies at AT&T and launching medical ventures for an investor group of twenty prominent children's hospitals as Executive Vice President of the start-up Child Health Corporation of America.

She serves on the National Advisory Board of the National Science Foundation for its Small Business Innovation Research Grants. She was an advisor to the Small Business Administration on its work with entrepreneurs under President Bill Clinton and served on the Small Business Administration Transition Committee under President George W. Bush. She has served on numerous boards and advisory committees to entrepreneurial organizations and institutes, including the National Venture Capital Association, the International Business Forum, and the Helzberg Entrepreneurial Mentoring Program.

Currently, Trish resides in San Jose, California. She has twin daughters, born in June 1990.

== Personal life ==
Born in Pittsburg, Kansas, Trish attended Pittsburg State University and received a B.A. in 1978, where she was the Student Body President and named the Outstanding Woman Graduate. She holds an MBA in Executive Management from Rockhurst University, Kansas City, Missouri.
