= QuestBridge =

American college access organization

- Founded: 1987; 39 years ago
- Founders: Michael McCullough; Ana Rowena Mallari
- Legal status: 501(c)(3) organization
- Location: Palo Alto, California, U.S.
- Website: www.questbridge.org
- Formerly called: Stanford Medical Youth Science Program (1987–1994); SYESP (1994-2004)

QuestBridge, (sometimes abbreviated as QB), is a national nonprofit based in Palo Alto, California. Its goal is to connect low-income and first-generation students with partner colleges and universities.

== Background ==
In 1987, Stanford University students Marc Lawrence and Michael McCullough started the Stanford Medical Youth Science Program as an outreach program for eight low-income students from East Palo Alto who were interested in a future in medicine. This program eventually led to the launch of the Quest program in 1994, then called the Stanford Youth Environmental Science Program (SYESP), aimed specifically at Stanford. Although they initially expanded to include Harvard University, this program ended by 2002 as the focus returned to Stanford. By 2004, the program had evolved into QuestBridge. Over the next decade QuestBridge developed partnerships with a number of colleges.

According to the Columbia Daily Spectator in 2021, QuestBridge's goal is to match "high school students with a full-ride offer of admission from one of its 45 partner universities. Targeting students based on data from admissions tests and networks of guidance counselors, QuestBridge aims to reach high-achieving students well before the typical January application deadlines, offering mentoring programs that make the admissions process—which traditionally advantages wealthy students—more accessible for low-income applicants."

== Activities ==
QuestBridge offers the College Prep Scholars Program for High School students, the National College Match, and the Match Scholarship, and, recently, the Graduate School Match.

== Partner colleges ==
As of 2025, the National College Match officially has 55 partner colleges, a mix of research universities and liberal arts colleges.

=== Northeast ===
- Amherst College
- Barnard College
- Bates College
- Boston College
- Boston University
- Bowdoin College
- Brown University
- Colby College
- Colgate University
- College of the Holy Cross
- Columbia University
- Cornell University
- Dartmouth College
- Hamilton College
- Harvard College
- Haverford College
- Massachusetts Institute of Technology
- Middlebury College
- Princeton University
- Skidmore College
- Smith College
- Swarthmore College
- Tufts University
- University of Pennsylvania
- Vassar College
- Wellesley College
- Wesleyan University
- Williams College
- Yale University

=== South ===
- Davidson College
- Duke University
- Emory University
- Johns Hopkins University
- Rice University
- University of Richmond
- University of Virginia
- Vanderbilt University
- Washington and Lee University

=== Midwest ===
- Carleton College
- Case Western Reserve University
- Denison University
- Grinnell College
- Macalester College
- Northwestern University
- Oberlin College
- University of Chicago
- University of Notre Dame
- Washington University in St. Louis

=== West ===
- California Institute of Technology
- Claremont McKenna College
- Colorado College
- Pomona College
- Scripps College
- Stanford University
- University of Southern California

== Graduate School Partners ==
As of 2026, the Graduate School Scholarship officially has 9 partner colleges, a mix of business and medical schools.

=== MBA ===
- Kellogg School of Management
- Stanford Graduate School of Business
- Booth School of Business
- Wharton School
- Mendoza College of Business
- Owen Graduate School of Management
- Yale School of Management

=== Medicine ===
- Icahn School of Medicine at Mount Sinai
- Tufts University School of Medicine
