= History of trade of the People's Republic of China =

Trade is a key factor of the economy of China. In the three decades following the removal of the Communist Chinese state in 1949, China's trade institutions at first developed into a partially modern system but inefficient in some ways. The drive to modernize the economy that began in 1978 required a sharp acceleration in commodity flows and greatly improved efficiency in economic transactions. In the ensuing years the reform and opening up was adopted by the government to develop a socialist market economy. This type of economy combined central planning with market mechanisms. The changes resulted in the decentralization and expansion of domestic and foreign trade institutions, as well as a greatly enlarged role for free market in the distribution of goods, and a prominent role for foreign trade and investment in economic development.

In 2013 China surpassed the United States as the largest trading nation in the world and plays a vital role in international trade, and has increasingly engaged in trade organizations and treaties in recent years. China became a member of the World Trade Organization in 2001. China also has free trade agreements with several nations, including China–Australia Free Trade Agreement, China–South Korea Free Trade Agreement, ASEAN–China Free Trade Area, Switzerland and Pakistan.

== Internal trade and distribution ==
=== Agriculture ===
Approximately 63 percent of the population was located in rural areas, where the majority of people worked in agriculture and rural industries. Under the responsibility system for agriculture instituted in 1981, the household replaced the production team as the basic production unit. Families contracted with the economic collective to farm a plot of land, delivered a set amount of grain or other produce and the agricultural tax to the state, and paid a fee to the collective. After meeting these obligations, the household was free to retain its surplus produce or sell it on free markets. Restrictions on private plots and household sideline production were lifted, and much of the produce from these were also sold on free markets.

Distribution of food and other agricultural goods to urban consumers, industry and rural areas deficient in food was carried out primarily by the state and secondarily by producers or cooperatives. The state procured agricultural goods by means of taxes in kind and by purchases by state commercial departments (state trading companies) under the Ministry of Commerce. The agricultural tax was not large, falling from 12 percent of the total value of agricultural output in 1952 to 5 percent in 1979.

In 1984 the number of agricultural and sideline products subject to state planning and purchasing quotas was reduced from twenty-nine to ten and included cereal grains, edible oil, cured tobacco, jute, hemp, and pigs. In 1985 the system of state purchasing quotas for agricultural products was abolished. Instead, the state purchased grain and cotton under contract at a set price. Once contracted quotas were met, grain and cotton were sold on the market at floating prices. If market prices fell below the listed state price, the state purchased all available market grain at the state price to protect the interests of producers. Vegetables, pigs, and aquatic products sold to urban, mining, and industrial areas were traded in local markets according to demand. Local commercial departments set the prices of these goods according to quality to protect the interests of urban consumers. All other agricultural goods were sold on the market to the state, to cooperatives, or to other producers.

Restrictions on private business activities were greatly reduced, permitting peasants as well as cooperatives to transport agricultural goods to rural and urban markets. This also allowed a rapid expansion of free markets in the countryside and in cities. The number of wholesale produce markets increased by 450 percent between 1983 and 1986, reaching a total of 1,100 and easing pressure on the state produce distribution network, which had been strained by the burgeoning agricultural production engendered by rural reforms. In 1986 free markets, called "commodity fairs," amounted to 61,000 nationwide.

Once the food was procured and transported to urban areas, it was sold to consumers by state-owned stores and restaurants. In the mid-1980s food items were also available in free markets, where peasants sold their produce, and in privately owned restaurants. As noted previously, the prices of pigs, aquatic products, and vegetables were determined by local authorities according to quality and demand. The prices of other products floated freely on the market. Except for grain, edible oil, and a few other rationed items, food items were in good supply.

Industrial goods used in agricultural production were sold to agricultural units in the 1980s. Local cooperatives or state supply and marketing bureaus sold most agricultural producer goods, including chemical fertilizer, s and insecticides, to households at set prices. The state also offered preferential prices for agricultural inputs to grain farmers to encourage grain production. Households were permitted to purchase agricultural machinery and vehicles to transport goods to the market. In order to ensure that rural units could cover the costs of the increasing quantities of industrial inputs required for higher yields, the government periodically reduced the prices of the industrial goods sold to farmers, while raising the procurement prices for agricultural products. In the mid-1980s, however, the price gap between agricultural and industrial products was widening to the disadvantage of farmers.

=== Industry ===
After 1982, reforms moved China's economy to a mixed system based on mandatory planning, guidance planning (use of economic levers such as taxes, prices, and credit instead of administrative fiat), and the free market. In late 1984 further reforms of the urban industrial economy, and commerce reduced the scope of mandatory planning, increased enterprise autonomy and the authority of professional managers, loosened price controls to rationalize prices, and cut subsidies to enterprises. These changes created a "socialist planned commodity economy," essentially a dual economy in which planned allocation and distribution is supplemented by market exchanges based on floating or free prices.

As a result of these reforms, the distribution of goods used in industrial production was based on mandatory planning with fixed prices, guidance planning with floating prices, and the free market. Mandatory planning covered sixty industrial products, including coal, crude oil, rolled steel, nonferrous metals, timber, cement, electricity, basic industrial chemicals, chemical fertilizers, major machines and electrical equipment, chemical fibers, newsprint, cigarettes, and defense industry products. Once enterprises under mandatory planning had met the state's mandatory plans and supply contracts, they could sell surplus production to commercial departments or other enterprises. Prices of surplus industrial producer goods floated within limits set by the state. The state also had a planned distribution system for important materials such as coal, iron and steel, timber, and cement. Enterprise managers who chose to exceed planned production goals purchased additional materials on the market. Major cities established wholesale markets for industrial producer goods to supplement the state's allocation system.

Under guidance planning, enterprises try to meet the state's planned goals but make their own arrangements for production and sales based on the orientation of the state's plans, the availability of raw and unfinished materials and energy supplies, and the demands on the market. Prices of products under guidance planning either are unified prices or floating prices set by the state or prices negotiated between buyers and suppliers. Production and distribution of products not included in the state's plans are regulated by market conditions.

=== Lateral economic cooperation ===
China also undertook measures to develop "lateral economic ties," that is, economic cooperation across regional and institutional boundaries. Until the late 1970s, China's planned economy had encouraged regional and organizational autarky, whereby enterprises controlled by a local authority found it almost impossible to do business with other enterprises not controlled by the same institution, a practice that resulted in economic waste and inefficiency. Lateral economic cooperation broke down some barriers in the sectors of personnel, resources, capital, technical expertise, and procurement and marketing of commodities. In order to promote increased and more efficient production and distribution of goods among regions and across institutional divisions, ties were encouraged among producers of raw and semi-finished materials and processing enterprises, production enterprises and research units (including colleges and universities), civilian and military enterprises, various transportation entities, and industrial, agricultural, commercial, and foreign trade enterprises.

A multitiered network of transregional economic cooperation associations also was established. The Seventh Five-Year Plan (1986–90) divided China into three regions — eastern, central, and western, each with its own economic development plans. In addition to the three major regions, three echelons of economic cooperation zones were created. The first echelon — national-level economic development zones — cut across several provincial-level boundaries and linked major economic areas. Among these were the Shanghai Economic Zone, the Northeastern Economic Zone, the energy production bases centering on Shanxi Province, the Beijing-Tianjin-Tangshan Economic Zone, and the Southwestern Economic Zone. The second-echelon network linked provincial-level capitals with designated ports and cities along vital communication lines and included the Huaihai Economic Zone (consisting of fifteen coastal prefectures and cities in Jiangsu, Anhui, Henan, and Shandong provinces) and the Pearl River Delta Economic Zone centered on the southern city of Guangzhou. The third tier of zones centered on provincial-level capitals and included the Nanjing Regional Economic Cooperation Association. Smaller-scale lateral economic ties below the provincial level, among prefectures, counties, and cities, also were formed.

=== Retail sales ===
Retail sales in China changed dramatically in the late 1970s and early 1980s as economic reforms increased the supply of food items and consumer goods, allowed state retail stores the freedom to purchase goods on their own, and permitted individuals and collectives greater freedom to engage in retail, service, and catering trades in rural and urban areas. Retail sales increased 300 percent from 1977 to 1985, rising at an average yearly rate of 13.9 percent — 10.5 percent when adjusted for inflation. In the 1980s retail sales to rural areas increased at an annual rate of 15.6 percent, outpacing the 9.7 percent increase in retail sales to urban areas and reflecting the more rapid rise in rural incomes. In 1977 sales to rural areas comprised 52 percent of total retail sales; in 1984 rural sales accounted for 59.2 percent of the total. Consumer goods comprised approximately 88 percent of retail sales in 1985, the remaining 12 percent consisting of farming materials and equipment.

The number of retail sales enterprises also expanded rapidly in the 1980s. In 1985 there were 10.7 million retail, catering, and service establishments, a rise of 850 percent over 1976. Most remarkable in the expansion of retail sales was the rapid rise of collective and individually owned retail establishments. Individuals engaged in businesses numbered 12.2 million in 1985, more than 40 times the 1976 figure. Furthermore, as state-owned businesses either were leased or turned over to collective ownership or were leased to individuals, the share of state-owned commerce in total retail sales dropped from 90.3 percent in 1976 to 40.5 percent in 1985.

In 1987 most urban retail and service establishments, including state, collective, and private businesses or vendors, were located either in major downtown commercial districts or in small neighborhood shopping areas. The neighborhood shopping areas were numerous and were situated so that at least one was within easy walking distance of almost every household. They were able to supply nearly all the daily needs of their customers. A typical neighborhood shopping area in Beijing would contain a one-story department store, bookstore, hardware store, bicycle repair shop, combined tea shop and bakery, restaurant, theater, laundry, bank, post office, barbershop, photography studio, and electrical appliance repair shop. The department stores had small pharmacies and carried a substantial range of housewares, appliances, bicycles, toys, sporting goods, fabrics, and clothing. Major shopping districts in big cities contained larger versions of the neighborhood stores as well as numerous specialty shops, selling such items as musical instruments, sporting goods, hats, stationery, handicrafts, cameras, and clocks.

Supplementing these retail establishments were free markets in which private and collective businesses provided services, hawked wares, or sold food and drinks. Peasants from surrounding rural areas marketed their surplus produce or sideline production in these markets. In the 1980s urban areas also saw a revival of "night markets," free markets that operated in the evening and offered extended service hours that more formal establishments could not match.

In rural areas, supply and marketing cooperatives operated general stores and small shopping complexes near village and township administrative headquarters. These businesses were supplemented by collective and individual businesses and by the free markets that appeared across the countryside in the 1980s as a result of rural reforms. Generally speaking, a smaller variety of consumer goods was available in the countryside than in the cities. But the lack was partially offset by the increased access of some peasants to urban areas where they could purchase consumer goods and market agricultural items.

A number of important consumer goods, including grain, cotton cloth, meat, eggs, edible oil, sugar, and bicycles, were rationed during the 1960s and 1970s. To purchase these items, workers had to use coupons they received from their work units. By the mid-1980s rationing of over seventy items had been eliminated; production of consumer goods had increased, and most items were in good supply. Grain, edible oil, and a few other items still required coupons. In 1985 pork rationing was reinstated in twenty-one cities as supplies ran low. Pork was available at higher prices in supermarkets and free markets.

== Foreign trade ==
China's share of the global trade surplus increased rapidly after China's joining the World Trade Organization in 2001. China's domestic production is greater than its domestic consumption. Its exports therefore exceed its imports, and its current account is in surplus. In 2010, China became the world's largest exporter. It has remained so as of at least 2023.

As of at least 2024, the global current account surplus is largely composed of China, Europe, and the Middle East.

=== History of Chinese foreign trade ===
Chinese foreign trade began as early as the Western Han dynasty (206 BCE-9 CE), when the famous "Silk Road" through Central Asia was pioneered by Chinese envoys. During later dynasties, Chinese ships traded throughout maritime Asia, reaching as far as the African coast, while caravans extended trade contacts in Central Asia and into the Middle East. Foreign trade was never a major economic activity, however, and Chinese emperors considered the country to be entirely self-sufficient. During parts of the Ming (1368–1644) and Qing (1644–1911) dynasties, trade was officially discouraged. In the mid-eighteenth century, the government restricted sea trade by setting up the Canton System.

In the nineteenth century, European nations used military force to initiate sustained trade with China. From the time of the Opium War (1839–42) until the founding of the People's Republic in 1949, various Western countries and, starting in the 1890s, Japan compelled China to agree to a series of unequal treaties that enabled foreigners to establish essentially autonomous economic bases and operate with privileged status in China. One classic account of this period is Carl Crow's 400 Million Customers, a humorous but realistic guide which has lasting insights. Foreign privileges were abolished when the People's Republic came into being.

In 1950, the PRC founded its first state-owned foreign trading company, China Import (which later became Sinochem). During the 1950s and 1960s, China Import obtained important resources for China's industrialization campaigns, such as rubber, petroleum, and fertilizer.

Foreign trade did not account for a large part of the Chinese economy for the first thirty years of the People's Republic. As in most large, continental countries, the amount of commerce with other nations was small relative to domestic economic activity. During the 1950s and 1960s, the total value of foreign trade was only about 2 percent of the gross national product (GNP). In the 1970s trade grew rapidly but in 1979 still amounted to only about 6 percent of GNP.

The importance of foreign trade in this period, however, far exceeded its volume. Foreign imports alleviated temporary but critical shortages of food, cotton, and other agricultural products as well as long-term deficiencies in a number of essential items, including raw materials such as chrome and manufactured goods such as chemical fertilizer and finished steel products. The acquisition of foreign plants and equipment enabled China to utilize the more advanced technology of developed countries to speed its own technological growth and economic development.

During the 1950s China imported Soviet plants and equipment for the development program of the First Five-Year Plan (1953–57). At the same time, the Chinese government expanded exports of agricultural products to repay loans that financed the imports. Total trade peaked at the equivalent of US$4.3 billion in 1959, but a sudden decline in agricultural production in 1959-61 required China's leaders to suspend further imports of machinery to purchase foreign grain. Under a policy of "self-reliance," in 1962 total trade declined to US$2.7 billion. As the economy revived in the mid-1960s, plants and equipment again were ordered from foreign suppliers, and substantial growth in foreign trade was planned. But in the late 1960s, the activities of the Cultural Revolution (1966–76) caused trade again to decline.

The pragmatic modernization drive led by party leaders Zhou Enlai and Deng Xiaoping and China's growing contacts with Western nations resulted in a sharp acceleration of trade in the early 1970s. Imports of modern plants and equipment were particularly emphasized, and after 1973 oil became an increasingly important export. Trade more than doubled between 1970 and 1975, reaching US$13.9 billion. Growth in this period was about 9 percent a year. As a proportion of GNP, trade grew from 1.7 percent in 1970 to 3.9 percent in 1975. In 1976 the atmosphere of uncertainty resulting from the death of Mao Zedong and pressure from the Gang of Four, whose members opposed reliance on foreign technology, brought another decline in trade.

Beginning in the late 1970s, China reversed the Maoist economic development strategy and, by the early 1980s, had committed itself to a policy of being more open to the outside world and widening foreign economic relations and trade. The opening up policy led to the reorganization and decentralization of foreign trade institutions, the adoption of a legal framework to facilitate foreign economic relations and trade, direct foreign investment, the creation of special economic zones, the rapid expansion of foreign trade, the importation of foreign technology and management methods, involvement in international financial markets, and participation in international foreign economic organizations. These changes not only benefited the Chinese economy but also integrated China into the world economy. In 1979 Chinese trade totaled US$27.7 billion - 6 percent of China's GNP but only 0.7 percent of total world trade. In 1985 Chinese foreign trade rose to US$70.8 billion, representing 20 percent of China's GNP and 2 percent of total world trade and putting China sixteenth in world trade rankings.

The table below shows the average annual growth (in nominal US dollar terms) of China's foreign trade during the reform era.

Period	Two-way trade	Exports	Imports
1981-85	+12.8%	+8.6%	+16.1%
1986-90	+10.6%	+17.8%	+4.8%
1991-95	+19.5%	+19.1%	+19.9%
1996–2000	+11.0%	+10.9%	+11.3%
2000-05	+24.6%	+25.0%	+24.0%
2006	+27.2%	+19.9%	+23.8%
2007	+25.6%	+20.8%	+23.4%
2008	+17.9%	+17.4%	+18.5%

=== Trade policy in the 1980s ===
Under the policy of opening up to the outside world, exports, imports, and foreign capital were all assigned a role in promoting economic development. Exports earned foreign currency, which was used to fund domestic development projects and to purchase advanced foreign technology and management expertise. Imports of capital goods and industrial supplies and foreign loans and investment were used to improve the infrastructure in the priority areas of energy, transportation, and telecommunications and to modernize the machine-building and electronics industries. To earn more foreign currency and to conserve foreign exchange reserves, foreign capital was also used to expand production of export commodities, such as textiles, and of import substitutes, such as consumer goods.

China has adopted a variety of measures to promote its foreign economic relations, maximizing the role of imports, exports, and foreign capital in economic development. Foreign trade organizations were reorganized, and control of imports and exports was relaxed or strengthened depending on the balance of trade and the level of foreign exchange reserves. Heavy purchases of foreign plants and equipment resulted in import restraint from 1980 to 1983. Because of the expansion of exports in the mid-1980s, a large foreign reserve surplus, and the decentralized management of foreign trade, imports surged. Huge, uncontrolled purchases of consumer goods led to trade deficits in 1984 and 1985, resulting in the introduction of an import and export licensing system, stricter controls on foreign exchange expenditures, and the devaluation of the yuan in order to reduce the trade deficit and ensure that machinery, equipment, and semi-finished goods, rather than consumer goods, were imported. In 1985 China had foreign exchange reserves of US$11.9 billion.

China joined a number of international economic organizations, becoming a member of the World Bank, the International Monetary Fund, the Asian Development Bank, the General Agreement on Tariffs and Trade (GATT), and the Multi-Fiber Agreement. China became an observer of GATT in 1982 and formally applied to participate as a full member in July 1986. It became a member in 1987. China also reversed its aversion to foreign capital, borrowing money from international lending organizations, foreign governments, and foreign commercial banks and consortia and permitting foreign banks to open branches in China. The Chinese government maintained a good credit rating internationally and did not pile up huge foreign debts like many other communist and developing countries. Between 1979 and 1985, China signed loans totaling US$20.3 billion, US$15.6 billion of which it already had used. Most loans went into infrastructure projects, such as energy and transportation, and funded raw materials imports. The Bank of China, the principal foreign exchange bank, established branches overseas and participated in international financial markets in Eurobonds and loan syndication.

Legal and institutional frameworks to facilitate foreign investment and trade also were created. Laws on taxation, joint ventures, foreign investments, and related areas were promulgated to encourage foreign investment. In 1979 China created four special economic zones in Shenzhen, Zhuhai, Shantou (in Guangdong Province), and Xiamen (in Fujian Province). (See Special Economic Zones of the People's Republic of China.) The special economic zones essentially were export-processing zones designed to attract foreign investment, expand exports, and import technology and expertise. In 1984 fourteen coastal cities were designated "open cities." These too were intended to attract foreign funds and technology. But in 1985 the government decided to concentrate resources on only four of the cities: Dalian, Guangzhou, Shanghai, and Tianjin. Although the special economic zones and open cities had the power to grant investment incentives, problems with the red tape, bureaucratic interference, and lack of basic infrastructure resulted in less foreign investment and fewer high-technology projects than initially envisioned.

From 1979 to 1985, China received US$16.2 billion in foreign investment. By 1986 China had over 6,200 foreign-funded businesses, including 2,741 joint ventures, 3,381 cooperatively managed businesses, and 151 enterprises with sole foreign investment. Of the joint ventures, 70 percent were in production enterprises (manufacturing or processing) and 30 percent were service industries (primarily hotels or tourism). Hong Kong provided 80 percent of the joint venture partners, the United States 7 percent, and Japan 6 percent.

=== Organization of foreign trade ===
The increasingly complex foreign trade system underwent expansion and decentralization in the late 1970s and 1980s. In 1979 the Ministry of Foreign Trade's nine foreign trade corporations lost their monopoly on import and export transactions as the industrial ministries were permitted to establish their own foreign trade enterprises. The provincial branch corporations of the state foreign trade corporations were granted more autonomy, and some provinces, notably Fujian, Guangdong, and the special municipalities of Beijing, Tianjin, and Shanghai were permitted to set up independent, provincial-level import-export companies. Some selected provincial enterprises were granted autonomy in foreign trade decisions. In 1982 the State Council's Import-Export Control Commission, Foreign Investment and Control Commission, Ministry of Foreign Trade, and Ministry of Foreign Economic Relations were merged to form the Ministry of Foreign Economic Relations and Trade. In 1984 the foreign trade system underwent further decentralization. Foreign trade corporations under this and other ministries and under provincial-level units became independent of their parent organizations and were responsible for their own profits and losses. An agency system for foreign trade also was established, in which imports and exports were handled by specialized enterprises and corporations acting as agents on a commission basis.

==== Ministry of Foreign Economic Relations and Trade ====
The main functions of the Ministry of Foreign Economic Relations and Trade were to establish and supervise foreign trade policies; to work with the State Planning Commission in setting long-term foreign trade plans and annual quotas for imports and exports; to control imports and exports through licenses and quotas; to supervise the management of foreign trade corporations and enterprises; and to coordinate economic and trade relations with foreign governments and international economic organizations. The ministry also undertook international market research, led institutes of foreign economic relations and trade, and directed the General Administration of Customs.

==== Foreign trade corporations and enterprises ====
In the late 1980s China had numerous specialized national corporations handling import and export transactions in such areas as arts and crafts, textiles, natural produce and animal byproducts, foodstuffs of various kinds, chemicals, light industrial products, metals and minerals technology, industrial machinery and equipment, petrochemical and petroleum products, scientific instruments, aerospace technology and services, ships, and weapons. Although nominally supervised by the Ministry of Foreign Economic Relations and Trade each of these corporations was responsible for its own profits and losses. Included among these enterprises, for example, was the Great Wall Industrial Corporation, which imported and exported transportation vehicles, satellites and other products associated with aerospace programs, mechanical equipment, electrical products, hardware and tools, medical apparatus, and chemicals. China Northern Industrial Corporation, subordinate to the Ministry of Ordnance Industry, used military production facilities to manufacture civilian products for export. The business activities of China Northern Industrial Corporation included the sale of heavy machinery, hardware and tools, and heavy-duty vehicles; light chemical industry products, such as plastic, paints, and coatings; and high-precision machinery and optical and optical-electronic equipment. Other corporations offered a variety of professional consulting services. One of these, the China International Economic Consultants Corporation, provided economic and legal expertise on investment and other economic activities.

==== Financial transactions and investment ====
Foreign exchange and reserves were controlled in the mid-1980s by the State Administration of Exchange Control under the People's Bank of China, the central bank. Foreign exchange allocations to banks, ministries, and enterprises were all approved by the State Administration of Exchange Control. The Bank of China, the foreign exchange arm of the People's Bank of China, lost its monopoly on all foreign exchange transactions in 1984 when the Agricultural Bank, People's Construction Bank, China Industrial and Commercial Bank, and China International Trust and Investment Corporation (CITIC) were permitted to deal in foreign currency. The Bank of China remained China's principal foreign exchange bank and provided loans for production and commercial transactions related to exports, set up branches overseas, maintained correspondent relations with foreign banks, and did research on international monetary trends. The Bank of China also was active in international financial markets through such activities as loan syndication and issuing of foreign bonds. CITIC, formed in 1979 to facilitate foreign investment in China, also borrowed and lent internationally and issued foreign bonds in addition to encouraging and participating in joint ventures, importing foreign technology and equipment, and making overseas investments. In 1986 CITIC was renamed CITIC Group and shifted its emphasis to power, metallurgical, and raw materials industries, which had trouble attracting investments. In late 1986 the CITIC Group had set up 47 joint ventures, invested in 114 domestic companies, and issued US$550 million in foreign bonds. The China Investment Bank was established in 1981 as a channel for medium- and long-term loans from international financial institutions such as the World Bank.

==== Other organizations involved in trade ====
The State Council's State Planning Commission and State Economic Commission were involved in long-term planning for the development of foreign trade, and they developed national priorities for imports and exports. Several other organizations under the State Council were also involved in foreign trade matters: the Special Economic Zones Office, State Import and Export Commodities Inspection Administration, General Administration of Customs, and China Travel and Tourism Bureau. The China Council for the Promotion of International Trade (CCPIT) assisted the Ministry of Foreign Economic Relations and Trade in foreign trade relations. CCPIT handled trade delegations to and from China, organized foreign trade exhibitions in China and Chinese exhibitions in other countries, and published periodicals promoting Chinese trade. The People's Insurance Company of China expanded its operations in 1980 for the purpose of encouraging foreign trade. New categories of coverage offered to foreign firms included compensatory trade, satellite launching, nuclear power plant safety, offshore oil development insurance, insurance against contract failure, and insurance against political risk.

=== Composition of foreign trade ===
The dominant pattern of foreign trade after 1949 was to import industrial producer goods from developed countries and to pay for them with exports of food, crude materials, and light manufactures, especially textiles. The pattern was altered as circumstances demanded; in the period of economic collapse following the Great Leap Forward (1958–60), food imports increased from a negligible amount in 1959 to 39 percent of all imports in 1962. At the same time, imports of machinery and equipment dropped from 41 percent to 5 percent of the total. From this time on, food and live animals remained a significant, although declining, share of imports, amounting to 14.8 percent of the total in 1980 but dropping to 4.1 percent in 1985. The pattern also shifted over time as China's industrial sector expanded, gradually increasing the share of exports accounted for by manufactured goods. Manufactures provided only 30 percent of all exports in 1959, 37.9 percent in 1975, and grew to 44.9 percent in 1985.

Important changes occurred in several specific trade categories in the 1970s and 1980s. Imports of textile fibers rose from 5.8 percent in 1975 to 10.7 percent in 1980 as the Chinese textile industry grew faster than domestic cotton supplies but then fell to 4 percent in 1985 as domestic cotton production increased. Imports of unfinished textile products also increased from 1.3 percent in 1975 to 5.3 percent in 1985 as a result of textile industry growth. Iron and steel accounted for approximately 20 percent of imports in the 1970s, fell to 11.6 percent in 1980, then rose to 14.9 percent in 1985. Imports of manufactured goods, machinery, and transportation equipment represented 62.6 percent of total import value in 1975, fell to 53.9 percent in 1980 as imports were cut back during the "period of readjustment" of the economy (1979–81), and rose again to 75.2 percent in 1985. On the export side, the share of foodstuffs fell to 12.5 percent in 1985. The fastest growing export item in the 1970s was petroleum, which was first exported in 1973. Petroleum rocketed to 12.1 percent of all exports in 1975, 22 percent in 1980, and 21.2 percent in 1985. In the 1980s textile exports grew rapidly. Although exports of unfinished textiles remained about 14 percent of total exports, all categories of textile exports rose from 5 percent in 1975 to 18.7 percent in 1984. In 1986 textiles replaced petroleum as China's largest single export item.

=== Trading partners ===
During the 1950s China's primary foreign trading partner was the Soviet Union. In 1959 trade with the Soviet Union accounted for nearly 48 percent of China's total. As relations between the two countries deteriorated in the early 1960s, the volume of trade fell, decreasing to only just over 7 percent of Chinese trade by 1966. During the 1970s trade with the Soviet Union averaged about 2 percent of China's total, while trade with all communist countries made up about 15 percent. In 1986, despite a trade pact with the Soviet Union, Chinese-Soviet trade, according to Chinese customs statistics, amounted to only 3.4 percent of China's total trade, while trade with all communist countries fell to 9 percent of the total. Studies have been conducted linking China's political influence through its trading ability. Countries that depend on China economically tend to appease China politically, allowing for China's newfound influence.

By the mid-1960s Japan had become China's leading trading partner, accounting for 15 percent of trade in 1966. Japan was China's most natural trading partner; it was closer to China than any other industrial country and had the best transportation links to it. The Japanese economy was highly advanced in those areas where China was weakest, especially heavy industry and modern technology, while China was well endowed with some of the important natural resources that Japan lacked, notably coal and oil. In the 1980s Japan accounted for over 20 percent of China's foreign trade and in 1986 provided 28.9 percent of China's imports and 15.2 percent of its exports. Starting in the late 1970s, China ran a trade deficit with Japan.

Beginning in the 1960s, Hong Kong was consistently the leading market for China's exports and its second largest partner in overall trade. In 1986 Hong Kong received 31.6 percent of Chinese goods sold abroad and supplied about 13 percent of China's imports. Hong Kong was a major market for Chinese foodstuffs and served as a trans-shipment port for Chinese goods reexported to other countries.

The United States banned trade with China until the early 1970s. Thereafter trade grew rapidly, and after the full normalization of diplomatic and commercial relations in 1979, the United States became the second largest importer to China and in 1986 was China's third largest partner in overall trade. Most American goods imported by China were either high-technology industrial products, such as aircraft, or agricultural products, primarily grain and cotton.

Western Europe has been important in Chinese foreign trade since the mid-1960s. The Federal Republic of Germany, in particular, was second only to Japan in supplying industrial goods to China during most of this period. China followed a policy of shopping widely for its industrial purchases, and it concluded deals of various sizes with nearly all of the West European nations. In 1986 Western Europe accounted for nearly 18 percent of China's foreign trade, with imports exceeding exports.

Third World countries have long served as a market for Chinese agricultural and light industrial products. In 1986 developing countries purchased about 15 percent of Chinese exports and supplied about 8 percent of China's imports. China has increased trade and investment ties with many African countries such as Chad, the Sudan, and the Democratic Republic of Congo, partly to secure strategic natural resources such as oil and minerals.

The UK is the second biggest investor in China and to note the biggest in America.

In 2018, the United States levied 25 percent tariffs on a wide range of Chinese imports, totaling $16 billion in Chinese goods, to which the Chinese Ministry of Commerce matched with a 25 percent tariff on $16 billion in U.S. imports. The China–United States trade war intensified in August 2019, with the U.S. threatening 10% tariffs on the remaining $300 billion in Chinese imports, after levying 25% tariffs on $250 billion worth of Chinese imports during the previous year. Chinese investments in U.S.-based startups slowed, from May 2018, becoming negligible by 2019. While the U.S. remained China’s largest trading partner, by 2023, China's exports to the U.S. were among its lowest in nearly two decades, partially attributed to lowered U.S. consumer demand post-pandemic. As of 2025, China had continued to increase its overall trade surplus with non-US markets buying its exports.

By 2020, China became the largest trading partner of more than 120 countries.

Annual global exports fell in 2023, for the first time in seven years, with the Association of Southeast Asian Nations as China’s largest regional trading partner, followed by the European Union. In 2023, trade with Russia accelerated rapidly, with Chinese exports increased by close to 47 percent. 2024 began with bilateral trade between China and Russia reaching a landmark $240 billion.

Effective 1 December 2024, China eliminated tariffs for goods imported from all of the countries that the United Nations categorizes as least developed and with which China has diplomatic relations. Thirty-three of the countries benefiting from the agreement are in Africa and the non-African countries receiving zero tariff treatment are Yemen, Kiribati, the Solomon Islands, Afghanistan, Bangladesh, Cambodia, Laos, Myanmar, Nepal, and East Timor.

== See also ==
- Economy of China
- Tourism in China
- China–United States trade war
- Australia–China trade war
