= X-inefficiency =

Internal inefficiency of a firm

X-inefficiency is a concept used in economics to describe instances where firms go through internal inefficiency resulting in higher production costs than required for a given output. This inefficiency can result from various factors, such as outdated technology, inefficient production processes, poor management, and lack of competition, and it results in lower profits for the inefficient firm(s) and higher prices for consumers. The concept of X-inefficiency was introduced by Harvey Leibenstein.

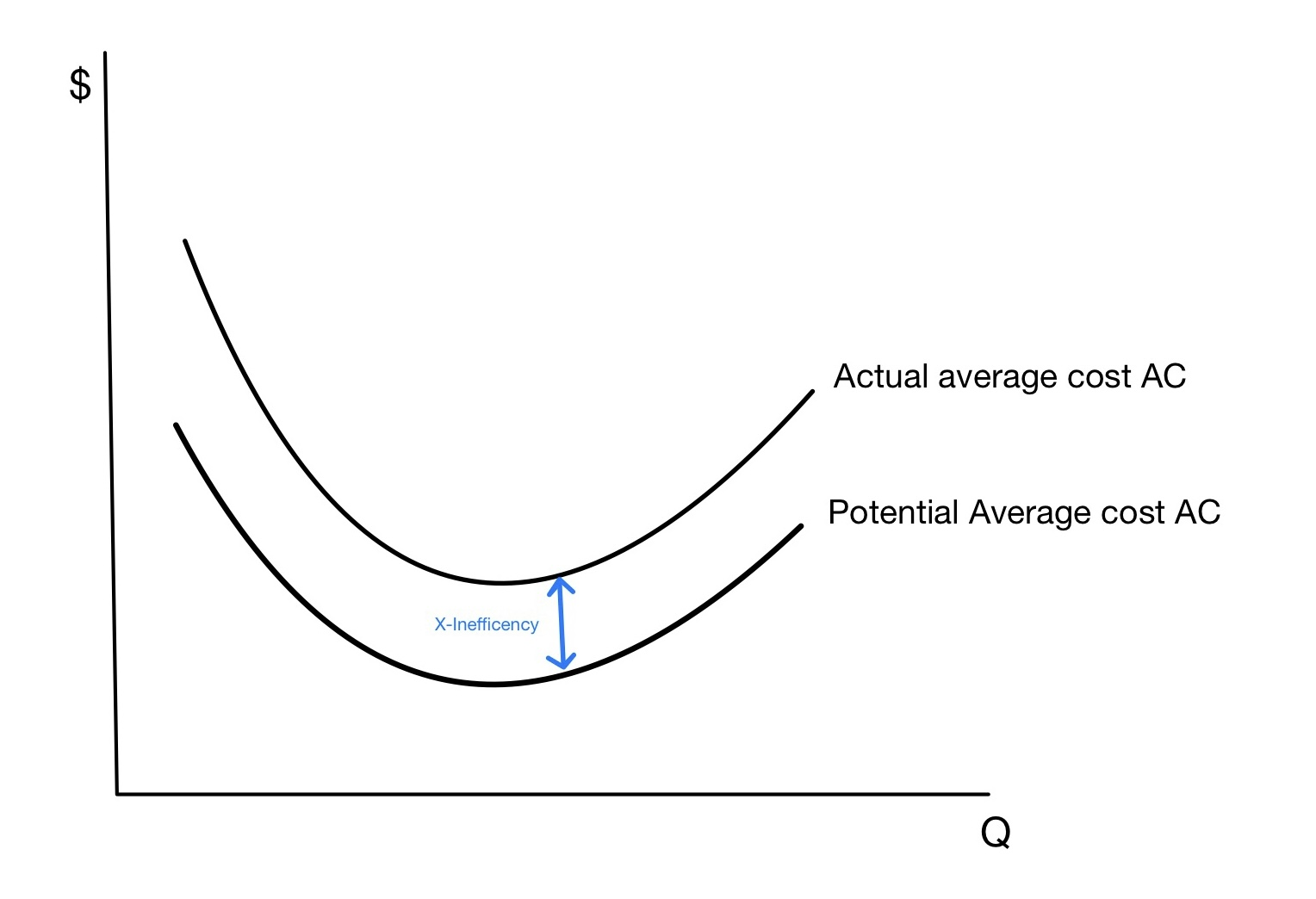
The difference between the potential and actual cost is known as X-Inefficiency. In normal instances, a firm could have an average cost curve at "Potential AC", however due to inefficiency, its actual average costs are higher.

in 1966, Harvard University Professor Harvey Leibenstein first introduced the concept of X-inefficiency in his paper "Allocative Efficiency vs. X- Efficiency", which was published in American Economic Review. X-Inefficiency refers to a firm's inability to fully utilize its resources, resulting in an output level that falls short of the maximum potential achievable given the resources and environment which is referred to as the efficiency frontier.

More so, X-inefficiency focuses on the importance of competition and innovation in promoting efficiency and reducing costs for firms, followed by higher profits and better output and prices for consumers.

X-inefficiency pin out irrational actions performed by firms in the market.

== Overview ==
The difference between the actual and minimum cost of production for a given output is defined as X-inefficiency.

Companies will incur X-inefficiency as a result of lack of motivation to control their costs, which brings the average cost of production above costs actually required for production. For example, the company has a potential cost curve, however, due to the lack of incentive to control costs, the company's actual cost curve is at a higher position than the potential cost curve.

The phenomenon of X-inefficiency relates to the allocation of effort, especially managerial effort.

Mainstream economic theory tends to assume that the management of firms act to maximize profit by minimizing the inputs used to produce a given level of output.

Competition energizes firms to seek productive efficiency gains and produce at lowest unit costs or risk losing sales to more efficient rivals. With market forms other than perfect competition, such as monopoly, productive inefficiency can persist because the lack of competition makes it possible to use inefficient production techniques and still stay in business. In addition to monopoly, sociologists have identified a number of ways in which markets may be organizationally embedded, and thus may depart in behavior from economic theory.

Organizational slack occurs when firms opt to employ more resources than are needed to produce a given level of output. Unused capacity results in X-inefficiency. Organizational slack can be explained by the principal-agent problem. In companies ownership and management are separate. Shareholders (the principal) elect directors (the agent) to act on their behalf and maximize shareholder value. Managers may take decisions that maximize their own and not shareholder objectives e.g. hiring extra staff to reduce manager workloads. This increases unit costs.

X-inefficiency only looks at the outputs that are produced with given inputs. It doesn't take into account whether the inputs are the best ones to be using, or whether the outputs are the best ones to be producing. For example, a firm that employs brain surgeons to dig ditches might still be X-efficient, even though reallocating the brain surgeons to curing the sick would be more efficient for society overall. In this sense, X-inefficiency focuses on productive efficiency and minimising costs rather than allocative efficiency and maximising welfare. For more extensive discussions, see Sickles and Zelenyuk (2019, p. 1-8, 469) and references therein.

== Arguments about X-inefficiency ==
Based on the assumption that the non-trade output of the firm is zero, Leibenstein argues that the X-inefficiency results from the lack of motivation of the resource owners to produce less than the maximum technical output of the trade goods. Leibenstein also argued that sometimes firms are not maximising their profits because there may be a certain level of efficiency, considering the human element which introduced by Leibenstein

== Causes to X-inefficiency ==
Monopoly Effect - A monopoly is a price maker in that its choice of output level affects the price paid by consumers. Consequently, a monopoly tends to price at a point where price is greater than long-run average costs. X-inefficiency, however tends to increase average costs causing further divergence from the economically efficient outcome. The sources of X-inefficiency have been ascribed to things such as over investment and empire building by managers, lack of motivation stemming from a lack of competition, and pressure by labor unions to pay above-market wages.

Suggested by Bergsman, The sum of X-inefficiency and monopoly returns is much larger than costs of mis-allocation.

In reality, industries with strong monopoly capacity will be more restricted by legal regulations. These regulations can impose competitive pressure on companies and prevent the industry turning into a true monopoly. Meanwhile, these artificial pressure of regulations can induce competitive pressure to companies, thus improving X-inefficiency.

When a particular market lacks competition, companies that are monopoly would have incentive to increase their prices to in order to make super-profits. In addition, the low pressure from having no competition would lead to difficulty controlling costs resulting in potential inefficiencies.

Government Effect - A state owned firm may not be operating to make profit, therefore it would have no incentive to cut costs.

Principal Agent Effect- Shareholders typically have a primary goal of maximizing profits and reducing costs, managers and employees may opt to have different priorities for example they may seek to keep costs low up to a point of maintaining job security, but allow costs to increase if it means improving the quality of their work experience.

Motivation Effect- Workers and managers may be demotivated to work diligently. This arises from various factors such as strained industrial relations, As a result employees may purposefully take extended breaks and not exert their best effort in order to increase profitability.

== Measurements of X-inefficiency ==
Cost Efficiency Analysis - To analyze the efficiency of firms or organizations in a particular industry or sector, a technique called cost frontier analysis is utilized. This involves approximating the minimum cost required to produce a specific level of output, which serves as the cost frontier. Companies that incur costs exceeding the frontier are deemed inefficient. Statistical methods are utilized in cost frontier analysis to estimate the frontier and gauge the extent of inefficiency within the firms.

Data Envelopment Analysis (DEA) - is a technique that does not rely on assumptions or preset parameters, and is used to assess the relative effectiveness of companies or groups. It evaluates how well firms use various inputs and outputs, and determines the highest level of efficiency attainable with the available resources. Ineffective firms are those that do not achieve this maximum level of efficiency.

Stochastic frontier analysis: - is a method that requires the estimation of a production function that focuses the unpredictable fluctuations in both inputs and outputs. The resulting result is then utilized to determined the efficiency of individual firms. When using this approach, any company that operates below the estimated level of efficiency is considered inefficient.

== Solutions of X-inefficiency ==
Government Regulation - Rules and regulations set by the government on firms can enhance market efficiency. Studies by Sappington and Stiglitz (1987) show that regulations can address market failures such as information asymmetry, externalities and natural monopolies thus reducing x-inefficiency. Removing Barriers to entry for new companies can force existing companies to operate more efficiently to stay competitive.

Antitrust Laws - The main goal of antitrust laws is to foster competitions and hinder the establishment of monopolies. In their paper, Hovenkamp et al. (2011), examine the function of antitrust laws in advancing economic effectiveness through the deterrence of anti-competitive actions, including but not limited to, price-fixing, bid-rigging, and exclusive dealing.

Some solutions to X-inefficiency include increasing competition in the market, implementing better management practices, and improving employee motivation and training. Implementing better management practices aid in the reducing x-inefficiency. For example lean management method concentrate on minimizing waste and increasing efficiency. Technology plays an important role in streamlining processes and lowering labor expense.

Another Approach of minimizing x-inefficiency involves Management input. Enhancing employee motivation and training - to help employees acquire the expertise and knowledge for optimal performance, can lower wastage, improve efficiency and productivity. Companies could offer rewards and incentives to employees that bring new innovative manufacturing process aimed at boosting efficiency and reducing waste.

== Conclusion ==
In conclusion, X-inefficiency refers to the inefficiencies within a company that result in higher production costs than necessary for a given output. These inefficiencies can stem from a variety of factors, including outdated technology, inefficient production processes, poor management, and a lack of competition. X-inefficiency underscores the importance of competition and innovation in fostering efficiency, which can reduce costs for companies, resulting in increased profits and better output and prices for consumers. However, X-inefficiency only focuses on productive efficiency and minimizing costs, not on allocative efficiency and maximizing welfare. Industries with strong monopolistic power, government-owned firms, and principal-agent problems are particularly prone to X-inefficiency. By addressing these underlying causes, firms can enhance efficiency and lower costs, which can benefit both the firm and the broader economy.

== See also ==
- Inefficiency
- Government failure
- Government waste
- Pareto efficiency
- Productive efficiency
