= Carl Schramm =

American economist (born 1946)

Carl J Schramm
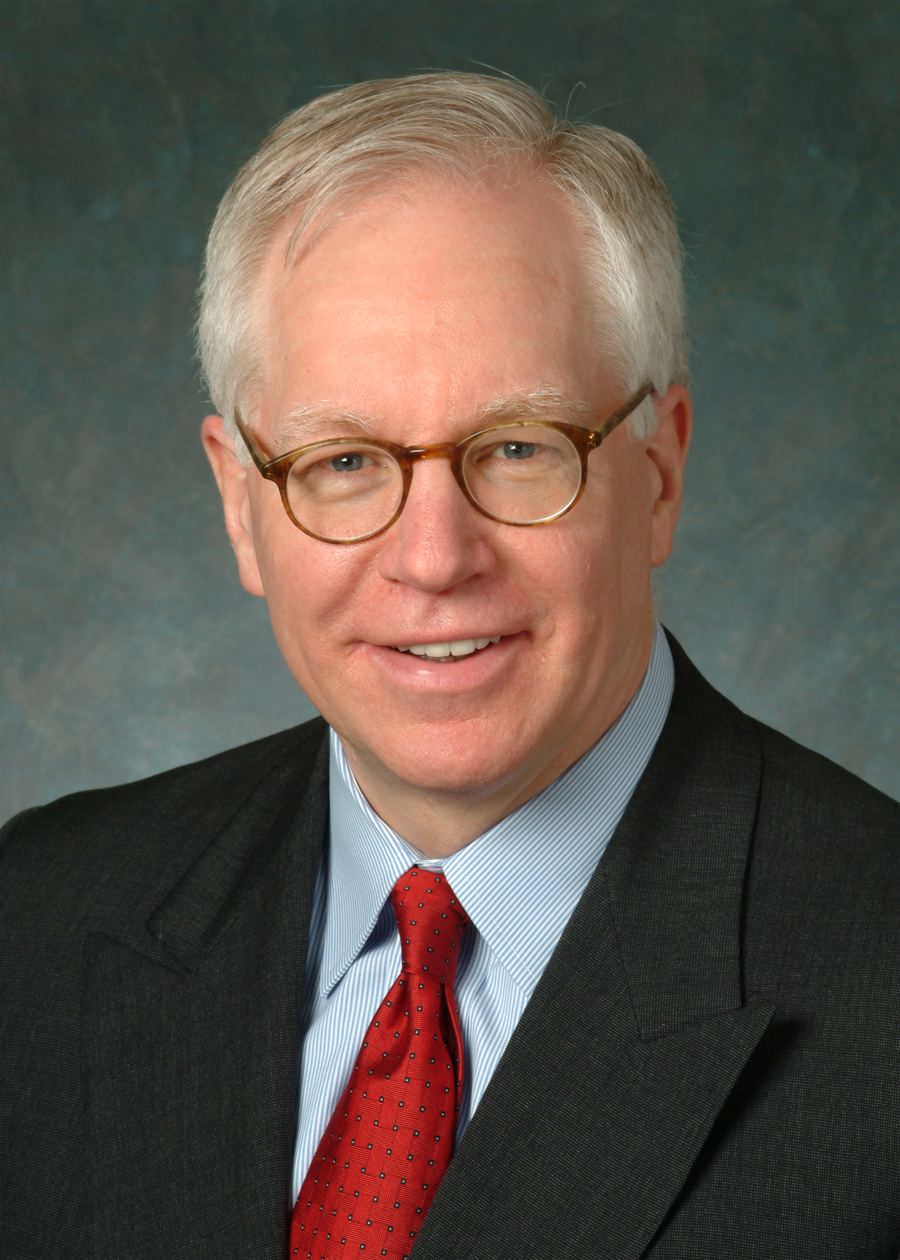
- Born: 1946 (age 79–80); Syracuse, New York, U.S.

Academic background
- Education: Georgetown University JD; University of Wisconsin MS, PhD; Le Moyne College BS

Academic work
- Discipline: University Professor
- Institutions: Syracuse University
- Notable ideas: Expeditionary economics Claremont Institute
- Awards: University of Rochester’s George Eastman Medal
- Website: www.carlschramm.com

Carl J. Schramm (born 1946) is an American economist, entrepreneur, author, former President of the Ewing Marion Kauffman Foundation, and University Professor at Syracuse University. He is the author of the book Burn the Business Plan: What Great Entrepreneurs Really Do, published by Simon & Schuster. The Economist named Schramm the "evangelist of entrepreneurship".

== Early life and education ==
Schramm was born in 1946, in Syracuse, New York. He graduated from Le Moyne College with a B.S. in economics and then received a M.S. in 1969, a Ph.D. in economics from the University of Wisconsin in 1973, and a Juris Doctor from the Georgetown University Law Center in 1978.

== Career ==
He was a Ford Foundation Doctoral Fellow and New York State Regents Graduate Fellow at Wisconsin. Schramm began his career as staff economist at the National Commission on State Workmen's Compensation Laws. He later served as Special Advisor to the Assistant Secretary for Policy at the U.S. Department of Labor and staff economist at U.S. Senate Committee on Human Resources. He was a Robert Wood Johnson Foundation Health Policy Fellow at the Institute of Medicine, National Academy of Sciences. Schramm received two consecutive Career Scientist Awards from the U.S. Public Health Service.

Schramm taught for fifteen years at the Johns Hopkins University, becoming associate professor of health policy and management. While there, he founded the Johns Hopkins Center for Hospital Finance and Management where he oversaw a postdoctoral program, the Robert Wood Johnson Foundation Faculty Fellowships in Health Care Finance. During this time, Schramm also served as Commissioner of the Maryland Health Services Cost Review Commission.

After co-founding HCIA, an aggregator of hospital data, Schramm became president of the Health Insurance Association of America (today called America's Health Insurance Plans). He also served as executive vice president of Fortis, formerly Time Insurance Company and now Assurant, and as president of its health insurance operations. While there, he developed several innovations, including transition coverage for recent college graduates. He founded Greenspring Advisors, a consulting and merchant banking firm in the health information and risk management industries. He is a founding member and a board member of the International IP Commercialization Council (IIPCC.org), a global NPO NGO.

After leaving the Kauffman Foundation, Schramm returned to teaching in August 2012, after being appointed University Professor at Syracuse University. He teaches classes in entrepreneurship and innovation at the Syracuse University School of Information Studies.

Schramm became the Director of MoviePass's parent company Helios and Matheson Analytics on November 9, 2016. He resigned on August 31, 2018, claiming management had withheld financial information, while making important decisions without the board's approval.

In 2019, Schramm became the chairman of the board for Lumeon, a leader in Care Pathway Management (CPM) solutions for healthcare organizations.

=== Ewing Marion Kauffman Foundation ===
In 2002, Schramm was recruited to head the Ewing Marion Kauffman Foundation. Under his leadership, the Kauffman Foundation has developed innovative programs that expose students to the power of entrepreneurship, open new pathways to effectively move university innovations into the marketplace, create better-qualified angel investors as a critical source of seed capital for entrepreneurs, and engage economists of the highest caliber to study the impact of entrepreneurship. Schramm has been instrumental in the development of a partnership with the U.S. Department of Commerce to create an international entrepreneurship resource at www.entrepreneurship.gov and also spearheaded the Foundation's sponsorship of the first-ever Global Entrepreneurship Week, which he announced in November 2007 with UK Prime Minister Gordon Brown. Schramm has also led Kauffman in the development of an international fellowship program (Kauffman Global Scholars Program), which is funded by other governments, including the United Kingdom and Denmark, for aspiring entrepreneurs.

Schramm stepped down at the end of 2011 after nearly ten years at the helm of Kauffman. The Kansas City Star wrote that, "Under Schramm's tenure, the foundation laid a geographically bigger entrepreneurship footprint, launching Global Entrepreneurship Week and becoming the nation's leading funder for entrepreneurship research." When Schramm came to the Kauffman Foundation, most of its grant-making went to local nonprofits, but he was recruited to make Kauffman a national and global institution. Schramm also made the Kauffman Foundation a pioneer in education—it became the first grant-making foundation to own and operate its own charter school.

=== Writer and speaker ===
A writer and speaker, Schramm has authored or coauthored scores of articles, testified before Congress on numerous occasions, and speaks frequently on entrepreneurship, innovation, and the economic future. His 2004 Foreign Affairs article, "Building Entrepreneurial Economies", is one of the journal's most requested reprints. Schramm is the author of The Entrepreneurial Imperative, co-author of Good Capitalism, Bad Capitalism, and editor of the American Assembly's Health Care and Its Costs.

In 2008, the National Chamber Foundation named Good Capitalism, Bad Capitalism one of the "Top Ten Books That Drive the Debate" in 2008.

He introduced the field of expeditionary economics in a Foreign Affairs article, published in May 2010.

He has written for The Wall Street Journal, USA Today, Newsweek, and various academic journals.

== Awards ==
In 2005, Schramm received the George Eastman Medal from the University of Rochester. In 2007, Schramm chaired the Secretary of Commerce's Measuring Innovation in the 21st Century Economy Advisory Committee, which produced the report, "Innovation Measurement: Tracking the State of Innovation in the American Economy."

In May 2009, Schramm gave the commencement address at the University of Illinois at Urbana-Champaign.

== Selected bibliography ==
- Schramm, Carl J., "Expeditionary Economics: Spurring Growth After Conflicts and Disasters," Foreign Affairs (May/June 2010)
- Schramm, Carl J., "Made in America," The National Interest (May/June 2010)
- Schramm, Carl J., "All Entrepreneurship is Social," Stanford Social Innovation Review (Spring 2010)
- Schramm, Carl J., "Managing Foundations Toward the Goal of Expanding Human Welfare," presented at the Distinguished Speakers Series of the University of Southern California's Center on Philanthropy and Public Policy (Los Angeles, Calif., February 21, 2008)
- Schramm, Carl J., Presidential address, "The Future of Entrepreneurship in a World Twenty Years From Now," TiE Entrepreneurial Summit 2008 (Bangalore, India, December 16, 2008)
- Schramm, Carl J., and Giovannini, Enrico, "Where Companies Grow," The Wall Street Journal, Real Clear Politics, Real Clear Markets (December 3, 2008)
- Schramm, Carl J., "The Future of the University and Public Research for the Entrepreneurial Age," Preface to The Future of the Research University: Meeting the Global Challenges of the 21st Century, a book of scholarly papers presented at the Kauffman-Planck Summit on Entrepreneurship Research and Policy (November 2008)
- Schramm, Carl J., "Why We Need Joe the Plumber’s Dream," CNN.com (October 21, 2008)
- Schramm, Carl J., "Crisis of Democracy," Stanford Social Innovation Review (Fall 2008)
- Schramm, Carl J., "Economics And The Entrepreneur," Claremont Review of Books (Spring 2008)
- Schramm, Carl J., "The High Cost of Low Ethics," Journal of Markets and Morality (January 2007)
- Schramm, Carl J., "Law Outside the Market," Harvard Journal of Law and Public Policy (February 2007)
- Schramm, Carl J. and Litan, Robert, "Immigrants and Laureates," The Washington Post (October 12, 2007)
- Schramm, Carl J. and Litan, Robert E., "Can Europe Compete," Commentary (September 2007)
- Schramm, Carl J. and Amar Bhide, "Phelp's Prize," Wall Street Journal (January 29, 2007)
- Schramm, Carl J., The Entrepreneurial Imperative (2006), HarperCollins.
