= Critical Energy Infrastructure Information =

Critical Energy Infrastructure Information (CEII) is specific engineering information such as plant schematics, information transfer ports, or detailed design information about proposed or existing critical infrastructure (physical or virtual) that meets these criteria:

- Relates details about the production, generation, transmission, or distribution of energy
- Could be useful to a person planning an attack on critical infrastructure
- Is exempt from mandatory disclosure under the Freedom of Information Act, and
- Gives strategic information beyond the location of the critical infrastructure

== See also ==
- Sensitive But Unclassified information
- Classified information in the United States
