= Contract failure =

Economic theory

Contract failure describes a situation in which the consumer of a good or service is unable to evaluate its quality, thus incentivizing the producer to produce a lower quality good or service. Such behavior creates suboptimal economic conditions. Contract failure is one explanation for the existence of non-profit organizations, although even non-profits can fall victim to contract failure in the right situations. Contract failure is connected to, but distinct from, market failure. Generally, non-profit organizations are more trusted because their corporate structures do not provide incentives to cheat.

== Information Asymmetry ==
The known cause of contract failure is called information asymmetry; when one party (the producer) has more information than the other party (the consumer) about a product or service. There is information inequality between the two parties. According to Young, there are three causes in which situations dealing with asymmetric information arise from, to include the following, 1) the quality of a product or service is too complex to be judged such as medical care or higher education; 2) the end consumer of the product or service cannot evaluate it him or herself such as a child in daycare or an elderly individual in a nursing home; and 3) the product or service is not consumed by the individual who purchased it, therefore the purchaser would never know if the producer delivered what was promised.

== Nonprofit Existence ==
When contract failure occurs, there is a suboptimal provision of public goods, which results in market failure. Arrow argues that nonprofits will step in and provide the necessary good or service in response to market failure. When markets potentially take advantage of the information asymmetry situation, nonprofits must protect the consumer.

== Non-Distribution Constraint ==
According to Hansmann, the “non-distribution constraint - prohibits the distribution of residual earnings to individuals who exercise control over the firm”. It prohibits those who have a vested interest in the organization from receiving the organization’s profit for personal gain. This constraint is a common characteristic of nonprofits, which creates less of a need for the company to take advantage of the consumer’s lack of knowing about such incidents. The nonprofit has no reason to cheat the consumer out of quality or service delivery because the organization's individuals cannot benefit in a direct manner. Therefore, the consumer is more likely to trust a nonprofit organization providing services than to trust a for-profit organization because of the nonprofit’s non-distribution constraint. According to Easley and O'Hara, state law stipulates that the organizations day-to-day costs should be reasonable.

== See also ==
- A Failure of Capitalism
