= Harvey Leibenstein =

American economist (1922–1994)

- Born: 1922; Ukrainian SSR, Soviet Union
- Died: February 28, 1994 (aged 71–72)
- Occupation: Economist
- Known for: X-inefficiency

Harvey Leibenstein (1922 – February 28, 1994) was a Ukrainian-born American economist. He was a professor of economics at the University of California, Berkeley from 1951 to 1967 and at Harvard University from 1967 to 1987. One of his most important contributions to economics was the concept of X-inefficiency and the critical minimum effort thesis in development economics.

== Work ==
Concerning his critical minimum effort thesis, he claimed that the underdeveloped countries are trapped by the vicious circle of poverty and many other growth retarding factors, which keep them in the state of backwardness. Those countries need to increase their per capita income to a certain level in which they can maintain a self-sustained growth rate. They need a critical minimum effort and thus to invest at more than a minimum level to overcome all of the obstacles of the underdeveloped countries.

In economics, X-efficiency is the effectiveness with which a given set of inputs are used to produce outputs. If a firm is producing the maximum output that it can with the resources that it uses, such as men and machinery, and the best technology available, it is said to be technical-efficient. X-inefficiency occurs when technical-efficiency is not achieved.

The concept of X-efficiency is also used in the theory of bureaucracy.

== Selected publications ==
- 1950, "Bandwagon, Snob and Veblen Effects in the Theory of Consumer Demand", Quarterly Journal of Economics, Vol.64 No.2 : Page 183–207
- 1954, A Theory of Economic-Demographic Development, Foreword by Frank Notestein, Princeton, New Jersey: Princeton University Press
- 1960, "Economic Backwardness and Economic Growth: Studies in the Theory of Economic Development"
- 1966, Allocative Efficiency vs. "X-Efficiency", The American Economic Review, Vol. LVI., June 1966
- 1968, Entrepreneurship and Development, The American Economic Review, 58(2):72–83
- 1969, Organizational or Frictional Equilibria, The Quarterly Journal of Economics, Vol. LXXXIII, No. 4, November 1969.
- 1974, Socio-economic Fertility Theories and Their Relevance to Population Policy, International Labour Review, May/June 1974.
- 1974, An Interpretation of the Economic Theory of Fertility, Journal of Economic Literature, Vol. XII, No. 2, June 1974.
- 1975, The Economic Theory of Fertility Decline, The Quarterly Journal of Economics, Vol LXXXIX, No. 1, February 1975.
- 1976, Beyond Economic Man, Cambridge: Harvard: University Press
- 1978, General X-Efficiency Theory and Economic Development, New York: Oxford University Press
- 1978, "'X-inefficiency Exists: A Reply to an Exorcist," American Economic Review, 68 (1978): 208
- 1979, "A Branch of Economics Is Missing: Micro-Micro Theory," Journal of Economic Literature, 17: 477-502 JSTOR 2723301
- 1979, "The General X-Efficiency Paradigm and the Role of the Entrepreneur". in: Mario Rizzo (ed.), Time, Uncertainty, and Disequilibrium. Lexington: Heath 1979, 127–139
- 1982, "The Prisoners's Dilemma in the Invisible Hand: An Analysis of Intrafirm Productivity." American Economic Review, (Papers and Proceedings) 72, no. 2 (May): 92–7
- 1983, "Property Rights and X-Efficiency: Comment." American Economic Review, 83: 831–42.
- 1987, Inside the Firm, The Inefficiencies of Hierarchy, Cambridge: Harvard University Press
