= Government failure =

Economic inefficiency

In public choice theory and welfare economics, a government failure is the creation of economic inefficiency by government intervention; a situation in which government action in the economy yields a worse allocation of resources than an available alternative. It is the analytical counterpart to market failure: as markets fail to allocate resources efficiently, government action intended to correct them may itself fall short. A government failure occurs when costs of an intervention outweigh its benefits, leaving society worse off that it would be under a different policy, or none at all.

Like market failure, government failure does not refer to the absence of a preferred outcome, but to the prevention of an efficient one, and can arise even where an efficient market solution was available. It is defined by inefficiency, rather than distribution: creating winners and losers doesn't by itself is a government failure. The defining feature of a government failure is the availability of an unrealised Pareto improvement—a change that could make everyone better off in a different arrangement.

Government may intervene by provision, taxation or subsidy, and regulation; and a government failure can arise from any of these. Such failure could be either on the demand side or on the supply side. Demand-side failures include preference-revelation problems and the illogic of voting and collective behaviour. Supply-side failures largely result from principal–agent problem. Frequently cited mechanisms and instances of government failure include regulatory capture and regulatory arbitrage, the unintended consequences of an intervention, and cases where an inefficient outcome is more feasible politically than the Pareto improvement to it.

== History ==
The phrase "government failure" emerged as a term of art in the early 1960s with the rise of intellectual and political criticism of government regulations. Building on the premise that the only legitimate rationale for government regulation was market failure, some economists in public choice developed new theories of how governments can make costly, failure-prone, or ill-advised interventions into markets, creating worse outcomes than the market failure itself.

An early use of "government failure" was by Ronald Coase (1964) in comparing an actual and ideal system of industrial regulation:

"Contemplation of an optimal system may provide techniques of analysis that would otherwise have been missed and, in certain special cases, it may go far to providing a solution. But in general its influence has been pernicious. It has directed economists’ attention away from the main question, which is how alternative arrangements will actually work in practice. It has led economists to derive conclusions for economic policy from a study of an abstract of a market situation. It is no accident that in the literature...we find a category "market failure" but no category "government failure." Until we realize that we are choosing between social arrangements which are all more or less failures, we are not likely to make much headway."

Roland McKean used the term in 1965 to suggest limitations on an invisible-hand notion of government behavior. More formal and general analysis followed in such areas as development economics, ecological economics, political science, political economy, public choice theory, and transaction-cost economics. Later, due to the popularity of public choice theory in 1970s, government failure attracted the attention of the academic community.

== Causes of government failure ==
=== Imperfect information ===
While a perfectly informed government might make an effort to reach the social equilibrium via quality, quantity, price or market structure regulation, it is difficult for the government to obtain necessary information (such as production costs) to make right decisions. This absence may then result in flawed quantity regulation when either too much or too little of the good or service is produced, subsequently creating either excess supply or excess demand. Imperfect information can come in many forms including; Uncertainty, Vagueness, Incompleteness and impreciseness. All creating flaws in government policy's and therefore in turn creating inefficiencies within the economy.

=== Political interference ===
Political decisions may be made for short-term gain in response to interference by special interest groups. Interference can lead to market failures.

=== Political self-interest ===
The self-interests of a politician may undermine fair governance. This could look like an inappropriate allocation of funds or time. Public funds could be pushed to influence voters or time could be allocated to pursue personal inequalities instead of actual market failures. When politicians prioritize their self-interests over their constituents' needs, they risk alienating the very voters who supported them. This erosion of public trust not only diminishes their popularity but also undermines the effectiveness of governance. Ultimately, such self-serving behavior detracts from addressing critical societal issues, leaving citizens disillusioned and the country vulnerable.

=== Policy myopia ===
Another cause of the government failure, as many critics of government intervention claim, is that politicians tend to look for short term fixes with instant and visible results that do not have to last, to difficult economic problems rather than making thorough analysis for solving long-term solutions.

=== Government intervention and evasion ===
It is believed that when a government tries to levy higher taxes on goods such as alcohol, also called de-merit goods, it can lead to increase attempts of illegal activities as tax avoidance, tax evasion or development of grey markets, people could try to sell goods with no taxes. Also legalising and taxing some drugs may arise in a quick expansion of the supply of drugs, which can lead to overconsumption, which can mean a decrease in welfare.

Government subsidies may lead to excess demand, which can be solved in two ways. Either the government chooses to meet all the demand, leading to higher consumption than socially efficient or if it knows the socially efficient amount, it can decide who gets how much of this quantity, a goal accomplished either through queuing and waiting-lists or through delegating the decisions to bureaucrats. Both solutions are inefficient, queueing first meets the demand of people at the front of the queue, which might not be the ones who need or want the product or service the most, but rather the luckiest or the ones with the right connections. Delegating the decisions to bureaucrats leads to problems with human factor and personal interests.

=== High administrative and enforcement costs ===
Market failure can occur when the costs of the project outweigh the benefits. Costs that are included are; Tax collection through government departments, law enforcement and policy creation. All these costs allocations are quite broad however a lot of people are required to run a secure and efficient system. Cost in the system are classified as a credence-costs as the buyer cannot tell the quantity bought even after buying them. This means that Administration and enforcement costs for a project can be over or under assumed and therefore a market failure can therefore be dismissed easily or over analyzed (however benefits can also be credence-benefits).

=== Regulatory capture ===
Regulatory capture is a problem which occurs whilst trying to implement regulations in selected industry. As government regulators usually have to meet with the industry representatives, they tend to form a personal relationship, which may lead them to be more sympathetic towards requirements and needs of given industry, subsequently making the regulations more favourable towards the producers rather than the society.

== Examples ==
=== Economic crowding out ===
Crowding out is when the government over corrects the market failure leading to the displacement of the private sector investment. This involves an excess amount of spending in the public sector, excess increase in interest rates or excess increase in taxes all of which will decrease the public sectors borrowing demand from banks. This whole situation forces inefficiencies in the private sector and therefore shrinks, causing a market failure from a government failure.

=== Regulatory ===
Regulatory arbitrage is a regulated institution's taking advantage of the difference between its real (or economic) risk and the regulatory position.

Regulatory capture is the co-opting of regulatory agencies by members of or the entire regulated industry. Rent seeking and rational ignorance are two of the mechanisms which allow this to happen. Rent extraction positively correlates with government size even in stable democracies with high income, robust rule of law mechanisms, transparency, and media freedom.

Regulatory risk is the risk faced by private-sector firms that regulatory changes will hurt their business.

=== Distortion of markets ===
Taxation can lead to market distortion. They can artificially change prices thus distorting markets and disturb the way markets allocate scarce resources. Also, taxes can give people incentive to evade them, which is illegal. Minimum price can also result in markets’ distortion (i.e. alcohol, tobacco). Consumer would spend more on harmful goods, therefore less of their income will be spent on beneficial goods. Subsidies can also lead to misuse of scarce resources as they can help inefficient enterprises by protecting them from free market forces.

Price floors and price ceilings can also lead to social inefficiencies or other negative consequences. If price floors, such as minimum wage, are set above the market equilibrium price, they lead to shortage in supply, in case of minimum wage to a higher unemployment. Similarly the price ceilings, if set under the market equilibrium price, lead to shortage in supply. Rent ceiling, for example may then lead to shortage in accommodation. Other problems often arise as consequences of these interventions. Black market of labor and higher unemployment among uneducated and poor are possible consequences of minimum wage while deterioration of residential buildings might be caused by rent ceiling and subsequent lack of incentive for landlords to provide the best services possible.

When housing supply is restricted by various government policies (such as zoning), inefficiencies and failure may result as the housing market becomes more expensive, less accessible and less optimal to society's needs.

=== State monopolies ===
Most government providers operate as monopolies (e.g. post offices). Their status is sometimes guaranteed by the government, protecting them from potential competition. Furthermore, as opposed to private monopolies, the threat of bankruptcy is eliminated, as these companies are backed by government money. The companies are thus not facing many efficiency pressures which would push them towards cost minimisation - causing a social inefficiency.

There are still some existing efficiency pressures on state monopoly managers. They mostly come from the possibility of their political masters being voted out of office. These pressures are however unlikely to be as effective as market pressures, the reasons being that the elections are held quite infrequently and even their results are often fairly independent on the efficiency of state monopolies.

=== Corruption ===
Corruption is the illegitimate use of public power to benefit a private interest. This erodes public trust.

== EU Fisheries Policy ==
A leading example of governmental failure can be seen with the consequences of the European Union's Common Fisheries Policy (CFP). Set up to counteract a concern of balancing natural marine resources with commercial profiteering, the CFP has in turn created political upheaval.

== Overcoming government failure ==
When a country gets into this kind of complicated situation it is not possible to reverse it right away. However, there are some arrangements that the government could do, to try to overcome it step by step. For example:

- The government could assign itself some future goals, and also try to fulfill them
- Competitive Tendering – making good offers to private and public sector which may arise on into competition between them, which is good for moving forward
- Public & Private Partnerships – involving private professional to make decisions to cut less necessary costs or to help to make some decisions. One of the key steps can also be to delegate the power and decisions, which may release the pressure from the government and help it to concentrate on more important cases

== See also ==
- Abilene paradox
- Crime statistics
- Debt crisis
- Dispersed knowledge
- Dunning–Kruger effect
- Economic interventionism
- Energy crisis
- Housing crisis
- Law of unintended consequences
- Market failure
- Obstructionism
- Pensions crisis
- Perverse subsidies
- Power outage
- Statism
- Tragedy of the commons
- X-inefficiency
- Overdiagnosis
