= Entrepreneurial economics =

Field of economics focussing on entrepreneurial activities within an economy

Entrepreneurial economics is the field of study that focuses on the study of entrepreneur and entrepreneurship within the economy. The accumulation of factors of production per se does not explain economic development. They are necessary factors of production, but they are not sufficient for economic growth.

William Baumol wrote in American Economic Review that "The theoretical firm is entrepreneurless – the Prince of Denmark has been expunged from the discussion of Hamlet". The article was a prod to the economics profession to attend to this neglected factor.

Entrepreneurship is difficult to analyse using the traditional tools of economics, e.g. calculus and general equilibrium models. Current textbooks have only a passing reference to the concept of entrepreneurship and the entrepreneur. Equilibrium models are central to mainstream economics, and exclude entrepreneurship.

Coase believed that economics has become a "theory-driven" subject that has moved into a paradigm in which conclusions take precedence over problems. "If you look at a page of a scientific journal like Nature," he said, "every few weeks you have statements such as, 'We’ll have to think it out again. These results aren't going the way we thought they would.' Well, in economics, the results always go the way we thought they would because we approach the problems in the same way, only asking certain questions. Entrepreneurial Economics challenges fundamental principles, using insights from models and theories in the natural sciences."

Studies about entrepreneurs in economics, psychology and sociology largely relate to four major currents of thought. Early thinkers such as Max Weber emphasized its occurrence in the context of a religious belief system, thereby suggesting that some belief systems do not encourage entrepreneurship. This contention has, however, been challenged by many sociologists. Karl Marx considered the economic system and mode of production as its sole determinants.

Another current of thought underscores the motivational aspects of personal achievement. This overemphasized the individual and his values, attitudes and personality. This thought, however, has been severely criticized by many scholars such as Kilby (1971) and Kunkel (1971).

== Economic functions of the entrepreneur ==
=== Richard Cantillon ===
Richard Cantillon (1680?-1734) was the earliest scholar of whom we know that paid considerable attention to the entrepreneur. He introduced the very concept of entrepreneur. The entrepreneur is functionally described as arbitrager. The motivating factor is the potential profit generated from the activity of "buying at a certain price and selling at an uncertain price".

=== Jean-Baptiste Say ===
Jean-Baptiste Say, himself an entrepreneur during a period of his life, states that the entrepreneur is a "superior kind of labour", as entrepreneurs serve as the "coordinator, modern leader and manager within his firm". According to Say, an entrepreneur is also a kind of "super-manager" because the exercise of the function needs a combination of rare qualities and experience and must demonstrate prudence, probity, and regularity.

=== Frank Knight ===
Frank Knight saw the entrepreneur as someone who undertakes business decisions under conditions of 'uncertainty'. Knightian uncertainty exists where there is no basis for objective probabilities, so that it is unmeasurable and decisions have to be made using subjective judgment. The entrepreneur earns economic profits as a reward for good judgment. Entrepreneurs are seen as being confident and venturesome.

=== Schumpeter ===
Schumpeter's concept is a synthesis of three different notions of the entrepreneur: risk bearer, innovator and a coordinator. He assigned the role of innovator to the entrepreneur, driving economic growth through a process of creative destruction, and not to the capitalist. Capitalists supply capital while entrepreneurs innovate. He stated that "whatever the type, everyone is an entrepreneur only when he actually carries out a new combination and loses that character as soon as he has built up his business, when he settles to running it as other people run their business." The focus here is not on a category of person, but on a function. He was perhaps influenced by his family history.

The Schumpeterian entrepreneur disrupts existing equilibrium. Innovation is a chaotic, unpredictable economic process, which cannot be modeled using the equilibrium based analytic methods used in mainstream economic theory.

=== Israel Kirzner ===
Israel Kirzner, an economist of the Austrian School, sees the entrepreneur as a discoverer and arbitrageur who is alert to opportunities for profit that exist due to market disequilibrium. In contrast to Schumpeter, for Kirzner, entrepreneurs are the "equilibrating force," making ongoing adjustments that contribute to a convergence on equilibrium via the market process.

=== Harvey Leibenstein ===
Harvey Leibenstein claimed that entrepreneurship is a creative response to x-inefficiency. Entrepreneurs are also gap-fillers, having the ability to perceive market opportunities and to develop new goods/services that are not currently being supplied. He postulates that entrepreneurs have the special ability to connect markets and make up for market deficiencies. Additionally, drawing from the theories of J.B. Say and Richard Cantillon, Leibenstein suggests that entrepreneurs have the ability to combine various inputs into new innovations in order to satisfy unfulfilled market demand.

=== Baumol ===
Baumol has argued that entrepreneurship can be either productive or unproductive. Unproductive entrepreneurs may pursue economic rents or crime. Societies differ significantly in how they allocate entrepreneurial activities between the two forms of entrepreneurship, depending on the 'rules of the game' such as the laws in each society.

=== David Audretsch ===
Audretsch defines the entrepreneur as the missing link between investment in knowledge and growth. It is the entrepreneur who adds value to scientific discovery. Entrepreneurship capital is then, just as capital and labor in a macroeconomic model, an essential factor of production in the economy.

== See also ==
- Social entrepreneurship
