= Ewing Marion Kauffman Foundation =

Public interest foundation in Kansas City, Missouri

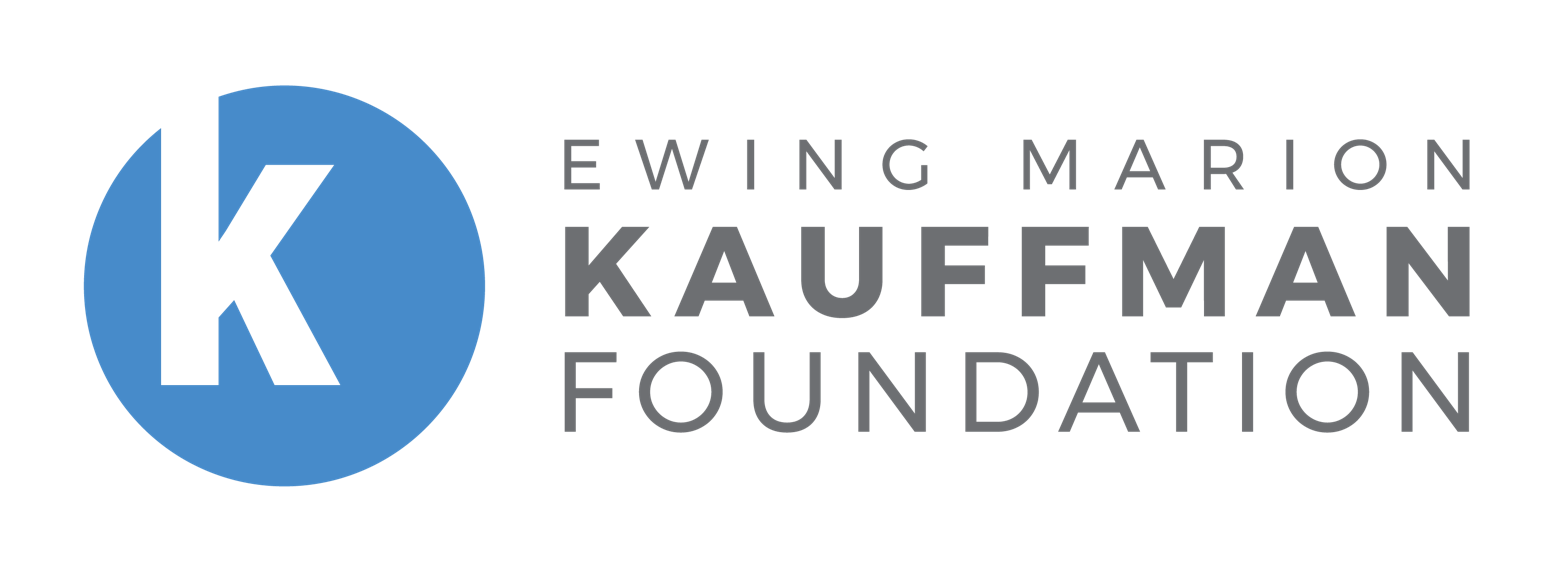
- Founded: 1966
- Founder: Ewing Marion Kauffman
- Purpose: Entrepreneurship and education
- Location: Kansas City, Missouri
- Method: Research and grant making
- Key people: DeAngela Burns-Wallace, President and CEO
- Revenue: $112,688,316 (2022)
- Expenses: $192,849,743 (2022)
- Endowment: US$2.7 billion
- Employees: 85
- Website: https://www.kauffman.org/

The Ewing Marion Kauffman Foundation (Kauffman Foundation) is a registered 501(c)(3) nonprofit, private foundation based in Kansas City, Missouri. It was founded in 1966 by Ewing Marion Kauffman, who had previously founded the drug company Marion Laboratories. The Kauffman Foundation works with communities to build and support programs that boost entrepreneurship, improve education, and contribute to the vibrancy of Kansas City.

The Kauffman Fellows Program, known for supporting diversity in the field of venture capital, originated from the Kauffman Foundation. In a statement quoted by TechCrunch, fellows said that they “have measured the importance of a trusted diverse network and how it impacts the success and longevity of the best investors in the industry. Research has shown that Kauffman Fellows not only have larger returns than the industry average, but they stay in the industry 15+ years post-fellowship, which is 2X the minimum number of years it takes to recognize success in venture capital.”

== Overview ==
The Ewing Marion Kauffman Foundation is a private, nonpartisan foundation that works with communities in education and entrepreneurship to increase opportunities that allow all people to learn, take risks, and own their success. The Kauffman Foundation is based in Kansas City, Missouri, and uses its $2.6 billion in assets to collaboratively help people be self-sufficient, productive citizens. Its grantmaking and research activities are focused on advancing entrepreneurship, improving education, and supporting civic development in Kansas City.

== History ==
In 2002, academic and entrepreneur Carl Schramm left a Maryland healthcare consulting firm to be president of the foundation until his resignation in 2012. Schramm's tenure was marked by conflicts over the foundation's mission and grant-making strategy, and he faced criticism for focusing on maximizing impact by awarding larger grants to fewer recipients and for de-emphasizing work in and around Kansas City. Conflict also arose over the extent of his executive authority, which prompted the Missouri Attorney General to recommend that the foundation strengthen its conflict of interest provisions and give the board of directors more decision-making authority.

In May 2022, EMKF announced a partnership and $10 million donation with the national community development initiative, Living Cities. The partnership saw the launch of a $100 million fund aimed at addressing the underinvestment in Black, indigenous, and people of colour communities.

== Kauffman Fellows Program ==
Kauffman Fellows Program

The Kauffman Fellowship is a two-year educational, networking, and leadership development program for venture capitalists. It originated as an endeavor of the foundation, from which it was spun out in 2000, and is now managed by the Center for Venture Education, based in Palo Alto, California. The Kauffman Fellows Program is a nonprofit with a history of identifying, educating, mentoring and networking future venture capitalists. As of 2011, it had graduated more than 250 fellows, who have worked at venture firms in the U.S. and internationally.

=== Notable Kauffman Fellows ===
- Trish Costello, Portfolia
- Mamoon Hamid, Social Capital
- Jenny Lee, GGV Capital
- Mala Gaonkar
- Michael McCullough
- Justin Rockefeller
