= Social welfare function =

Function that ranks states of society according to their desirability

In welfare economics and social choice theory, a social welfare function—also called a social ordering, ranking, utility, or choice function—is a function that ranks a set of social states by their desirability. Each person's preferences are combined in some way to determine which outcome is considered better by society as a whole. It can be viewed as mathematically formalizing Rousseau's idea of a general will.

Social welfare functions are studied by economists as a way to identify socially optimal decisions, giving a procedure to rigorously define which of two outcomes should be considered better for society as a whole (e.g., to compare two different possible income distributions). They are also used by democratic governments to choose between several options in elections, based on the preferences of voters; in this context, a social choice function is typically referred to as an electoral system.

The notion of social utility is analogous to the notion of a utility function in consumer choice. However, a social welfare function is different in that it is a mapping of individual utility functions onto a single output, in a way that accounts for the judgments of everyone in a society. Social utility function can vary depending on administrative division of society, such as federalism, separatism, or regional integration.

There are two different notions of social welfare used by economists:

- Ordinal (or ranked voting) functions only use ordinal information; i.e., whether one choice is better than another.
- Cardinal (or rated voting) functions also use cardinal information; i.e., how much better one choice is compared to another.

Arrow's impossibility theorem is a key result of social welfare functions, showing an important difference between social and consumer choice: whereas it is possible to construct a rational (non-self-contradictory) decision procedure for consumers based only on ordinal preferences, it is impossible to do the same in the social choice setting, making any such ordinal decision procedure a second-best.

== Terminology and equivalence ==
Some authors maintain a distinction between three closely related concepts:

1. A social choice function selects a single best outcome (a single candidate who wins, or multiple candidates if there is a tie).
2. A social ordering function lists the candidates from best to worst.
3. A social scoring function maps the candidates to a number representing their quality. For example, the standard social scoring function for first-preference plurality is the total number of voters who rank a candidate first.

Every social ordering can be made into a choice function by considering only the highest-ranked outcome. Less obviously, though, every social choice function is also an ordering function. Deleting the best outcome, then finding the new winner, results in a runner-up who is assigned second place. Repeating this process gives a full ranking of all candidates.

Because of this close relationship, the three kinds of functions are often conflated by abuse of terminology.

=== Example ===
Consider an instant-runoff election between Top, Center, and Bottom. Top has the most first-preference votes; Bottom has the second-most; and Center (positioned between the two) has the fewest first preferences.

	Round 1	Round 2
Top	40	53
Center	~~26~~	Eliminated
Bottom	34	47

Under instant-runoff voting, Top is the winner. Center is eliminated in the first round, and their second-preferences are evenly split between Top and Bottom, allowing Top to win.

To find the second-place finisher, we find the winner if Top had not run. In this case, the election is between Center and Bottom.

Runner-up	Round 1
—	Excluded
Center	66
Bottom	34

(Note that the finishing order is not the same as the elimination order for sequential elimination methods: despite being eliminated first, Center is the runner-up in this election.)

== Ordinal welfare ==
In a 1938 article, Abram Bergson introduced the term social welfare function, with the intention "to state in precise form the value judgments required for the derivation of the conditions of maximum economic welfare." The function was real-valued and differentiable. It was specified to describe the society as a whole. Arguments of the function included the quantities of different commodities produced and consumed and of resources used in producing different commodities, including labor.

Necessary general conditions are that at the maximum value of the function:

- The marginal dollar's worth of welfare is equal for each individual and for each commodity.
- The marginal "dis-welfare" of each dollar's worth"of labor is equal for each commodity produced by each labor supplier.
- The marginal dollar cost of each unit of resources is equal to the marginal value productivity for each commodity.

Bergson argued that welfare economics had described a standard of economic efficiency despite dispensing with interpersonally-comparable cardinal utility, the hypothesization of which may merely conceal value judgments—and purely subjective ones at that.

Earlier neoclassical welfare theory, heir to the classical utilitarianism of Bentham, often treated the law of diminishing marginal utility as implying interpersonally comparable utility. Irrespective of such comparability, income or wealth is measurable, and it was commonly inferred that redistributing income from a rich person to a poor person tends to increase total utility (however measured) in the society. But in (1935, ch VI), Lionel Robbins argued that how or how many utilities, as mental events, change relative to each other is not measurable by any empirical test, thus making them unfalsifiable. He therefore rejected such as incompatible with his own philosophical behaviorism.

Auxiliary specifications enable comparison of different social states by each member of society in preference satisfaction. These help define Pareto efficiency, which holds that if all alternatives have been exhausted, to put at least one person in a more preferred position with no one put in a less preferred position. Bergson described an "economic welfare increase" (later called a Pareto improvement) as at least one individual moving to a more preferred position with everyone else indifferent. The social welfare function could then be specified in a substantively individualistic sense to derive Pareto efficiency (optimality).

Paul Samuelson (2004, p. 26) noted that Bergson's function "could derive Pareto optimality conditions as necessary but not sufficient for defining interpersonal normative equity." Still, Pareto efficiency could also characterize one dimension of a particular social welfare function with distribution of commodities among individuals characterizing another dimension. As Bergson noted, a welfare improvement from the social welfare function could come from the "position of some individuals" improving at the expense of others. That social welfare function could then be described as characterizing an equity dimension.

Samuelson (1947, p. 221) himself stressed the flexibility of the social welfare function to characterize any one ethical belief, Pareto-bound or not, consistent with:

- A complete and transitive ranking (an ethically "better," "worse," or "indifferent" ranking) of all social alternatives, and
- One set out of an infinity of welfare indices and cardinal indicators to characterize the belief

As Samuelson (1983, p. xxii) noted, Bergson clarified how production and consumption efficiency conditions are distinct from the interpersonal ethical values of the social welfare function.

Samuelson further sharpened that distinction by specifying the welfare function and the possibility function (1947, pp. 243–49). Each has as arguments the set of utility functions for everyone in the society. Each can—and commonly does—incorporate Pareto efficiency. The possibility function also depends on technology and resource restraints. It is written in implicit form, reflecting the feasible locus of utility combinations imposed by the restraints and allowed by Pareto efficiency. At a given point on the possibility function, if the utility of all but one person is determined, the remaining person's utility is determined. The welfare function ranks different hypothetical sets of utility for everyone in the society from ethically lowest on up (with ties permitted), that is, it makes interpersonal comparisons of utility. Welfare maximization then consists of maximizing the welfare function subject to the possibility function as a constraint. The same welfare maximization conditions emerge as in Bergson's analysis.

For a two-person society, there is a graphical depiction of such welfare maximization at the first figure of Bergson–Samuelson social welfare functions. Relative to consumer theory for an individual as to two commodities consumed, there are the following parallels:
- The respective hypothetical utilities of the two persons in two-dimensional utility space is analogous to respective quantities of commodities for the two-dimensional commodity space of the indifference-curve surface.
- The welfare function is analogous to the indifference-curve map.
- The possibility function is analogous to the budget constraint.
- Two-person welfare maximization at the tangency of the highest welfare function curve on the possibility function is analogous to the tangency of the highest indifference curve on the budget constraint.

Kenneth Arrow's 1963 book demonstrated the problems with such an approach, though he would not immediately realize this. Along earlier lines, Arrow's version of a social welfare function, also called a "constitution," maps a set of individual orderings (ordinal utility functions) for everyone in society to a social ordering, which ranks alternative social states such as which of several candidates should be elected.

Arrow found that contrary to the assertions of Lionel Robbins and other behaviorists, dropping the requirement of real-valued (and thus cardinal) social orderings makes rational or coherent behavior at the social level impossible. This result is now known as Arrow's impossibility theorem. Arrow's theorem shows that it is impossible for an ordinal social welfare function to satisfy a standard axiom of rational behavior, called independence of irrelevant alternatives. According to this axiom, changing the value of one outcome should not affect choices that do not involve this outcome. For example, if a customer buys apples because he prefers them to blueberries, telling him that cherries are on sale should not make him buy blueberries instead of apples.

John Harsanyi later strengthened this result by showing that if societies must make decisions under uncertainty, the unique social welfare function satisfying coherence and Pareto efficiency is the utilitarian rule.

== Cardinal welfare ==
A cardinal social welfare function is a function that takes as input numeric representations of individual utilities (also known as cardinal utility), and returns as output a numeric representation of the collective welfare. The underlying assumption is that individuals utilities can be put on a common scale and compared. Examples of such measures include life expectancy or per capita income.

For purposes of this section, income is adopted as the measurement of utility.

The form of the social welfare function is intended to express a statement of objectives of a society.

The utilitarian or Benthamite social welfare function measures social welfare as the total or sum of individual utilities:

$$W = \sum_{i=1}^n Y_i$$

where $W$ is social welfare and $Y_i$ is the income of individual $i$ among $n$ individuals in society. In this case, maximizing the social welfare means maximizing the total income of the people in the society, without regard to how incomes are distributed in society. It does not distinguish between an income transfer from rich to poor and vice versa. If an income transfer from the poor to the rich results in a bigger increase in the utility of the rich than the decrease in the utility of the poor, the society is expected to accept such a transfer because the total utility of the society has increased as a whole. Alternatively, society's welfare can also be measured under this function by taking the average of individual incomes:

$$W = \frac{1}{n}\sum_{i=1}^n Y_i = \overline{Y}$$

In contrast, the max-min or Rawlsian social welfare function (based on the philosophical work of John Rawls) measures the social welfare of society on the basis of the welfare of the least well-off individual member of society:

$$W = \min(Y_1, Y_2, \cdots, Y_n)$$

Here, maximizing societal welfare would mean maximizing the income of the poorest person in society without regard for the income of other individuals.

These two social welfare functions express very different views about how a society would need to be organized in order to maximize welfare, with the first emphasizing total incomes and the second emphasizing the needs of the worst-off. The max-min welfare function can be seen as reflecting an extreme form of uncertainty aversion on the part of society as a whole, as it is concerned only with the worst conditions that a member of society could face.

Amartya Sen proposed a welfare function in 1973:

$$W_\mathrm{Gini} = \overline{Y} (1-G)$$

The average per capita income of a measured group (e.g., a nation) is multiplied with $(1-G)$ where $G$ is the Gini index, a relative inequality measure.

James E. Foster (1996) proposed to use one of Atkinson's Indexes, which is an entropy measure. Due to the relation between Atkinson's entropy measure and the Theil index, Foster's welfare function also can be computed directly using the Theil-L Index:

$$W_\mathrm{Theil-L} = \overline{Y} \mathrm{e}^{-T_L}$$

The value yielded by this function has a concrete meaning. There are several possible incomes that could be earned by a person randomly selected from a population with an unequal distribution of incomes. This welfare function marks the income that a randomly selected person is most likely to have. Similar to the median, this income will be smaller than the average per capita income:

$$W_\mathrm{Theil-T} = \overline{Y} \mathrm{e}^{-T_T}$$

Here, the Theil-T index is applied. The inverse value yielded by this function has a concrete meaning as well. There are several possible incomes to which a Euro may belong, randomly picked from the sum of all unequally distributed incomes. This welfare function marks the income that a randomly selected Euro most likely belongs to. The inverse value of that function will be larger than the average per capita income.

=== Axioms of cardinal welfarism ===
Suppose we are given a preference relation R on utility profiles. R is a weak total order on utility profiles—it can tell us, given any two utility profiles, if they are indifferent or one is better than the other. A reasonable preference ordering should satisfy several axioms:

1. Monotonicity: if the utility of one individual increases while all other utilities remain equal, R should strictly prefer the second profile. For example, it should prefer the profile (1, 4, 4, 5) to (1, 2, 4, 5). Such a change is called a Pareto improvement.
2. Symmetry: reordering or relabeling the values in the utility profile should not change the output of R. This axiom formalizes the idea that every person should be treated equally in society. For example, R should be indifferent between (1, 4, 4, 5) and (5, 4, 4, 1), since these profiles are reorders of each other.
3. Continuity: for every profile v, the set of profiles weakly better than v and the set of profiles weakly worse than v are closed sets.
4. Independence of unconcerned agents: R should be independent of individuals whose utilities have not changed. For example, if R prefers (2, 2, 4) to (1, 3, 4), it also prefers (2, 2, 9) to (1, 3, 9); the utility of agent 3 should not affect the comparison between two utility profiles of agents 1 and 2. This property can also be called locality or separability. It allows us to treat allocation problems in a local way, and separate them from the allocation in the rest of society.

Every preference relation with properties 1–4 can be represented as by a function $W$, which is a sum of the form:

$$W(u_1,\dots,u_n) = \sum_{i=1}^n w(u_i)$$

where $W$ is a continuous increasing function.

=== Harsanyi's theorem ===
Introducing one additional axiom—the nonexistence of Dutch Books, or equivalently that social choice behaves according to the axioms of rational choice—implies that the social choice function must be the utilitarian rule—i.e., the weighting function $w(u)$ must be equal to the utility functions of each individual. This result is known as Harsanyi's utilitarian theorem. According to Harsanyi's theorem, any non-utilitarian social choice function will be incoherent; in other words, it will agree to some bets that are unanimously opposed by every member of society. However, it is still possible to establish properties of such functions.

Instead of imposing rational behavior on the social utility function, we can impose a weaker criterion called independence of common scale: the relation between two utility profiles does not change if both of them are multiplied by the same constant. For example, the utility function should not depend on whether we measure incomes in cents or dollars.

If the preference relation has properties 1–5, the function w must be the isoelastic function:

$\frac{c^{1-\eta} - 1}{1-\eta}$

This family has some familiar members:

- The limit when $\eta \to -\infty$ is the leximin ordering.
- For $\eta = 0$ we get the Nash bargaining solution—maximizing the product of utilities.
- For $\eta = 1$ we get the utilitarian welfare function—maximizing the sum of utilities.
- The limit when $\eta \to \infty$ is the leximax ordering.

If we require the Pigou–Dalton principle (that inequality is not a positive good), then $\eta$ in the above family must be at most 1.

== See also ==
- Aggregation problem
- Arrow's impossibility theorem
- Community indifference curve
- Distribution (economics)
- Economic welfare
- Extended sympathy
- Gorman polar form
- Justice (economics)
- Liberal paradox
- Production-possibility frontier
- Social choice theory
- Social policy
- Welfare economics
- Rank aggregation - the task of aggregating several input rankings into a single output ranking.
