= Economic fairness =

Economic fairness may refer to:

- Equal opportunity
- Economic equity
- Economic justice
  - Social justice
