= Social Choice and Individual Values =

1951 book by Kenneth Arrow

- Author: Kenneth Arrow
- Language: English
- Subject: Social choice theory
- Published: 1951 John Wiley & Sons; 1963 Yale University Press; 2012 Yale University Press
- Publication place: United States of America
- ISBN: 0300179316 (3rd edition)

Kenneth Arrow's monograph Social Choice and Individual Values (1951; revised in 1963 and 2012) and a theorem within it created modern social choice theory, a rigorous melding of social ethics and voting theory with an economic flavor. Somewhat formally, the "social choice" in the title refers to Arrow's representation of how social values from the set of individual orderings would be implemented under the constitution. Less formally, each social choice corresponds to the feasible set of laws passed by a "vote" (the set of orderings) under the constitution even if not every individual voted in favor of all the laws.

The work culminated in what Arrow called the "General Possibility Theorem," better known thereafter as Arrow's (impossibility) theorem. The theorem states that, absent restrictions on either individual preferences or neutrality of the constitution to feasible alternatives, there exists no social choice rule that satisfies a set of plausible requirements. The result generalizes the voting paradox, which shows that majority voting may fail to yield a stable outcome.

== Introduction ==
The Introduction contrasts voting and markets with dictatorship and social convention (such as those in a religious code). Both exemplify social decisions. Voting and markets facilitate social choice in a sense, whereas dictatorship and convention limit it. The former amalgamate possibly differing tastes to make a social choice. The concern is with formal aspects of generalizing such choices. In this respect it is comparable to analysis of the voting paradox from use of majority rule as a value.

In the simplest case of the voting paradox, there are 3 candidates, A, B, and C, and 3 voters with preferences listed in decreasing order as follows.

Voter 1: A B C
Voter 2: B C A
Voter 3: C A B

By majority rule for 2-candidate votes, A beats B, B beats C, but C beats A. Majority rule works for an individual selecting consistently among the 3 candidates but not necessarily for the "social choice" in any general sense.

Arrow asks whether other methods of taste aggregation (whether by voting or markets), using other values, remedy the problem or are satisfactory in other ways. Here logical consistency is one check on acceptability of all the values. To answer the questions, Arrow proposes removing the distinction between voting and markets in favor of a more general category of collective social choice.

The analysis uses ordinal rankings of individual choice to represent behavioral patterns. Cardinal measures of individual utility and, a fortiori, interpersonal comparisons of utility are avoided on grounds that such measures are unnecessary to represent behavior and depend on mutually incompatible value judgments (p. 9).

Following Abram Bergson, whose formulation of a social welfare function launched ordinalist welfare economics, Arrow avoids locating a social good as independent of individual values. Rather, social values inhere in actions from social-decision rules (hypostatized as constitutional conditions) using individual values as input. Then 'social values' means "nothing more than social choices" (p. 106).

Topics implicated along the way include game theory, the compensation principle in welfare economics, extended sympathy, Leibniz's principle of the identity of indiscernibles, logrolling, and similarity of social judgments through single-peaked preferences, Kant's categorical imperative, or the decision process.

== Terminology ==
The book defines a few terms and logical symbols used thereafter and their applied empirical interpretation (pp. 11–19, 23). Key among these is the "vote" ('set of orderings') of the society (more generally "collectivity") composed of individuals ("voters" here) in the following form:

- Voters, a finite set with at least two members, indexed as i = 1, 2, ... n.
- Commodities, the objects of choice (things that voters might want, goods and services), both private and public (municipal services, statecraft, etc.).
- A social state is a specification (formally, an element of a vector) of a distribution among voters of commodities, labor, and resources used in their productions.
- The set of social states, the set of all 'social states', indexed as x, y, z, . ., with at least three members.
- A (weak) ordering, a ranking by a voter of all 'social states' from more to less preferred, including possible ties.
- The set of 'orderings', the set of all n orderings, one ordering per voter.

Example: Three voters {1,2,3} and three states {x,y,z}. Given the three states, there are 13 logically possible orderings (allowing for ties).* Since each of the individuals may hold any of the orderings, there are 13*13*13 = 2197 possible "votes" (sets of orderings). A well-defined social-decision rule selects the social state (or states, in case of tie) corresponding to each of these "votes."

* Namely, from highest to lowest ranked for each triplet and with 'T's indexing ties:

x y z x y T z (x z T y is the same ranking as x y T z, so is omitted, etc.)
y x z y T x z
z x y z x T y
x z y x T z y
y z x y z T x
z y x z T y x z T y T x

The ordering of each voter ranks social states, including the distribution of commodities (possibly based on equity, by whatever metric, or any other consideration), not merely direct consumption by that voter. So, the ordering is an "individual value", not merely, as in earlier analysis, a purely private "taste". Arrow notes that the distinction is not sharp. Resource allocation is specified in the production of each social state in the ordering.

The comprehensive nature of commodities, the set of social states, and the set of orderings was noted by early reviewers.

The two properties that define any ordering of the set of objects in question (all social states here) are:

- connectedness (completeness): All the objects in the set are included in the ranking (no "undecideds" nor "abstentions") and
- transitivity: If, for any objects x, y, and z in the set, x is ranked at least as high as y and y is ranked at least as high as z, then x is ranked at least as high as z.

A standard indifference-curve map for an individual has these properties and so is an ordering. Each ray from the origin ranks (conceivable) commodity bundles from least preferred on up (no ties in the ranking). Each indifference curve ranks commodity bundles as equally preferred (all ties in the ranking).

The earlier definition of an ordering implies that any given ordering entails one of three responses on the "ballot" as between any pair of social states (x, y): better than, as good as, or worse than (in preference ranking). (Here "as good as" is an "equally-ranked," not a "don't know," relation.)

The denotations of these three "ballot" options are respectively:
- x P y (voter prefers x to y)
- x I y (voter indifferent between x and y)
- y P x (voter prefers y to x).

It is convenient for deriving implications to compact the first two of these options on the ballot to one, an "at least as good as" relation, denoted R:

- x R y: voter either prefers x to y or is indifferent between x and y but not both.

The above two properties of an ordering are then axiomatized as:

connectedness: For all (the objects of choice in the set) x and y, either x R y or y R x.

transitivity: For all x, y, and z, x R y and y R z imply x R z.

Thus, alternation ('or') and conjunction ('and') of R relations represent both the properties of an ordering for all the objects of choice.

The I and P relations are then defined as:

x I y: x R y and y R x (x as good as y means x at least as good as y and vice versa).

x P y: not y R x (y R x includes one of two options. Negating that option leaves only x P y, the third of the original three options, on the ballot.)

From this, conjunction ('and') and negation ('not') of mere pairwise R relations can (also) represent all the properties of an ordering for all the objects of choice. Hence, the following shorthand.

An ordering of a voter is denoted by R. That ordering of voter i is denoted with a subscript as $R_i$.

If voter i changes orderings, primes distinguish the first and second, say $R_i$ compared to $R_i$' . The same notation can apply for two different hypothetical orderings of the same voter.

The interest of the book is in amalgamating sets of orderings. This is accomplished through a 'constitution'.

- A constitution (or social welfare function) is a voting rule mapping each (of at least one) set of orderings onto a social ordering, a corresponding ordering of the set of social states that applies to each voter.

A social ordering of a constitution is denoted R. (Context or a subscript distinguishes a voter ordering R from the same symbol for a social ordering.)

For any two social states x and y of a given social ordering R:

x P y is "social preference" of x over y (x is selected over y by the rule).

x I y is "social indifference" between x and y (both are ranked the same by the rule).

x R y is either "social preference" of x over y or "social indifference" between x and y (x is ranked least as good as y by the rule).

A social ordering applies to each ordering in the set of orderings (hence the "social" part and the associated amalgamation). This is so regardless of (dis)similarity between the social ordering and any or all the orderings in the set. But Arrow places the constitution in the context of ordinalist welfare economics, which attempts to aggregate different tastes in a coherent, plausible way.

The social ordering for a given set of orderings as to the set of social states is analogous to an indifference-curve map for an individual as to the set of commodity bundles. There is no necessary interpretation from this that "society" is just a big voter. Still, the relation of a set of voter orderings to the outcome of the voting rule, whether a social ordering or not, is a focus of the book.

Arrow (pp. 15, 26–28) shows how to go from the social ordering R for a given set of orderings to a particular 'social choice' by specifying:

- the environment, S: the subset of social states that is (hypothetically) available (feasible as to resource quantity and productivity), not merely conceivable.

The social ordering R then selects the top-ranked social state(s) from the subset as the social choice set.

This is a generalization from consumer demand theory with perfect competition on the buyer's side. S corresponds to the set of commodity bundles on or inside the budget constraint for an individual. The consumer's top choice is at the highest indifference curve on the budget constraint.

Less informally, the social choice function is the function mapping each environment S of available social states (at least two) for any given set of orderings (and corresponding social ordering R) to the social choice set, the set of social states each element of which is top-ranked (by R) for that environment and that set of orderings.

The social choice function is denoted C(S). Consider an environment that has just two social states, x and y: C(S) = C([x, y]). Suppose x is the only top-ranked social state. Then C([x, y]) = {x}, the social choice set. If x and y are instead tied, C([x, y]) = {x, y}. Formally (p. 15), C(S) is the set of all x in S such that, for all y in S, x R y ("x is at least as good as y").

The next section invokes the following. Let R and R' stand for social orderings of the constitution corresponding to any 2 sets of orderings. If R and R' for the same environment S map to the same social choice(s), the relation of the identical social choices for R and R' is represented as: C(S) = C'(S).

== Conditions and theorem ==
A constitution might seem to be a promising alternative to dictatorship and vote-immune social convention or external control. Arrow describes the connectedness of a social ordering as requiring only that some social choice be made from any environment of available social states. Since some social state will prevail, this is hard to deny (especially with no place on the ballot for abstention). The transitivity of a social ordering has an advantage over requiring unanimity (or much less) to change between social states if there is a maladapted status quo (that is, one subject to "democratic paralysis"). Absent deadlock, transitivity crowds out any reference to the status quo as a privileged default blocking the path to a social choice (p. 120).

Arrow proposes the following "apparently reasonable" conditions to constrain the social ordering(s) of the constitution (pp. 25, 96-97).

- 1. Universal (Unrestricted) Domain U (subsequently so called): Every logically possible set of orderings maps to its own social ordering.

Each voter is permitted by the constitution to rank the set of social states in any order, though with only one ordering per voter for a given set of orderings.

Arrow refers to a constitution satisfying this condition as collective rationality. It can be compared to the rationality of a voter ordering. But the prescription of collective rationality, which Arrow proposes, is distinct from the descriptive use of a voter ordering, which he deploys. Hence, his denial at the end of the book that collective rationality is "merely an illegitimate transfer from the individual to society." (p. 120)

- 2. Independence of Irrelevant Alternatives I: Let $R_1$, ..., $R_n$ and $R_1$' , ..., $R_n$' be 2 sets of orderings in the constitution. Let S be a subset of hypothetically available (not merely conceivable) social states, say x and y, from the set of social states. For each voter i, let the ranking of x and y be the same for $R_i$ and for $R_i$' . (Different voters could still have different rankings of the 2 social states.) Then the social orderings for the 2 respective sets of orderings select the same state(s) from the subset as the social choice.

Condition I: Let $R_1$, ..., $R_n$ and $R_1$' , ..., $R_n$' be 2 sets of orderings in the constitution. Let S be any subset of hypothetically available social states from the set of social states. For each voter i and for each pair of x and y in S, let x $R_i$ y if and only if x $R_i$' y. Then the social choice functions for the 2 respective sets of orderings map to an identical social choice set: C(S) = C'(S).

This identical mapping happens even with differences in rankings of any voter between the two sets of orderings outside that subset of social states. Consider a hypothetical “run-off vote” between say only 2 available social states. The social choice is associated with the sets of rankings for that subset, not with rankings of unavailable social states beyond the subset. Thus, that social choice for the subset is unaffected by say a change in orderings only beyond the subset.

Arrow describes this condition as an extension of ordinalism with its emphasis on prospectively observable behavior (for the subset in question). He ascribes practical advantage to the condition from "every known electoral system" satisfying it (p. 110).

- 3. The (weak) Pareto Principle P: For any x and y in the set of social states, if all prefer x over y, then x is socially selected over y.#

Condition P: For any x and y in the set of social states, if, for every voter i, x $P_i$ y, then x P y.

As Sen suggests, Pareto unanimity (with universal domain) overrides any social convention selecting some social state.

The conditions, particularly the second and third, may seem minimal, but jointly they are harsh, as may be represented in either of two ways.

- Arrow's Theorem [1]: The 3 conditions of the constitution imply a dictator who prevails as to the social choice whatever that individual's preference and those of all else.

An alternate statement of the theorem adds the following condition to the above:

- 4. Nondictatorship D: No voter in the society is a dictator. That is, there is no voter i in the society such that for every set of orderings in the domain of the constitution and every pair of distinct social states x and y, if voter i strictly prefers x over y, x is socially selected over y.

Condition D: There is no voter i in {1, ..., n} such that for every set of orderings in the domain of the constitution and every pair of social states x and y, x $P_i$ y implies x P y.

- Arrow's Theorem [2]: The constitution is impossible, that is, the 4 conditions of a constitution imply a contradiction.

Each voter has an ordering (by attribution). Yet a set of orderings used as an argument of the voting rule does not carry over to a social ordering, with a corresponding loss of social adaptivity and constitutional generality, whether descriptive or prescriptive.

# Pareto is stronger than necessary in the proof of the theorem that follows above. But it is invoked in Arrow (1963, ch. VIII) for a simpler proof than in Arrow (1951). In the latter, Arrow uses 2 other conditions, that with (2) above imply Pareto (1963, p. 97; 1987, p. 127):

- 3a. Monotonicity M (Positive Association of Individual and Social Values), as in Arrow (1987, p. 125): For a given set of orderings with social ordering R, such that state x is socially preferred to state y, if the preference for x rises in some individual ordering(s) and falls in none, x is also socially preferred to y in the social ordering for the new set of orderings.

Arrow (1951, p. 26) describes social welfare here as at least not negatively related to individual preferences.

- 3b. As defined by Arrow (1951, pp. 28–29), an Imposed Constitution is a constitution such that for some alternative social states x and y and for any set of orderings $R_1$, ..., $R_n$ in the domain and corresponding social ordering R, the social ranking is x R y.

Non-imposition N (Citizens' Sovereignty): A constitution is not to be imposed.

Under imposition, for every set of orderings in the domain, the social ranking for at least one x and y is only x R y. The vote makes no difference to the outcome.

For the special case of all preferring y over x, the vote still makes no difference. If the invariant social ranking applies to only one pair of distinct social states, the constitution would violate N. In this respect, as a representation of excluding convention, N is thorough.

== Proof ==
The proof is in two parts (Arrow, 1963, pp. 97–100). The first part considers the hypothetical case of some one voter's ordering that prevails ('is decisive') as to the social choice for some pair of social states no matter what that voter's preference for the pair, despite all other voters opposing. It is shown that, for a constitution satisfying Unrestricted Domain, Pareto and Independence, that voter's ordering would prevail for every pair of social states, no matter what the orderings of others. So, the voter would be a Dictator. Thus, Nondictatorship requires postulating that no one would so prevail for even one pair of social states.

The second part considers more generally a set of voters that would prevail for some pair of social states, despite all other voters (if any) preferring otherwise. Pareto and Unrestricted Domain for a constitution imply that such a set would at least include the entire set of voters. By Nondictatorship, the set must have at least 2 voters. Among all such sets, postulate a set such that no other set is smaller. Such a set can be constructed with Unrestricted Domain and an adaptation of the voting paradox to imply a still smaller set. This contradicts the postulate and so proves the theorem.

== Summary, interpretation, and aftereffects ==
The book proposes some apparently reasonable conditions for a "voting" rule, in particular, a 'constitution', to make consistent, feasible social choices in a welfarist context. But then any constitution that allows dictatorship requires it, and any constitution that requires nondictatorship contradicts one of the other conditions. Hence, the paradox of social choice.

The set of conditions across different possible votes refined welfare economics and differentiated Arrow's constitution from the pre-Arrow social welfare function. In so doing, it also ruled out any one consistent social ordering to which an agent or official might appeal in trying to implement social welfare through the votes of others under the constitution. The result generalizes and deepens the voting paradox to any voting rule satisfying the conditions, however complex or comprehensive.

The 1963 edition includes an additional chapter with a simpler proof of Arrow's Theorem and corrects an earlier point noted by Blau. It also elaborates on advantages of the conditions and cites studies of Riker and Dahl that as an empirical matter intransitivity of the voting mechanism may produce unsatisfactory inaction or majority opposition. These support Arrow's characterization of a constitution across possible votes (that is, collective rationality) as "an important attribute of a genuinely democratic system capable of full adaptation to varying environments" (p. 120).

The theorem might seem to have unravelled a skein of behavior-based social-ethical theory from Adam Smith and Bentham on. But Arrow himself expresses hope at the end of his Nobel prize lecture that, though the philosophical and distributive implications of the paradox of social choice were "still not clear," others would "take this paradox as a challenge rather than as a discouraging barrier."

The large subsequent literature has included reformulation to extend, weaken, or replace the conditions and derive implications. In this respect Arrow's framework has been an instrument for generalizing voting theory and critically evaluating and broadening economic policy and social choice theory.

== See also ==
- Arrow's impossibility theorem
- Kenneth Arrow, Section 1 (the theorem and a distributional difficulty of intransitivity + majority rule)
- Abram Bergson
- Buchanan and Tullock, The Calculus of Consent: Logical Foundations of Constitutional Democracy
- Independence of irrelevant alternatives
- Pareto efficiency, strong and weak
- Path dependence, contrasted in Arrow with path independence, which a social ordering assures
- Political argument
- Public choice theory
- Social choice theory
- Social welfare function
- Rule according to higher law
- Utilitarianism
- Voting paradox
- Voting system
- Welfare economics
- Welfarism
- JEL D71 by scrolling down for Social Choice
