= Contributive justice =

Contributive justice "emphasizes that justice is achieved not when benefits are received, but rather when there is both the duty and opportunity for everyone to contribute labor and decision-making."

== See also ==
- Consequentialism
- Constitutional economics
- Distributive justice
- Distribution (economics)
- Extended sympathy
- Environmental racism
- Injustice
- Interactional justice
- Justice (economics)
- Redistributive justice
- Restorative justice
- Retributive justice
- Rule According to Higher Law
- Rule of law
- Service recovery paradox
- Teaching for social justice
- Transformative justice
- Utilitarianism
- John Rawls
