= Collective choice =

Collective choice may refer to:

- Social choice
- Collective action
