= Rank aggregation =

Rank aggregation is a fundamental task in social choice theory. Given a collection of different rankings (total orders) over the same set of objects, the goal is to produce a single ranking of those objects that, in some way, aggregates the different opinions expressed by the input rankings.

Rank aggregation has applications in many fields. For example, in biological research, several research methods may produce different rankings of objects (e.g., genes), and it is desirable to combine these into a single ranking. Shili Lin provides a survey of rank aggregation methods in biological contexts.

== Kemeny method ==
The Kemeny method is a commonly used approach to rank aggregation. It selects an output ranking that minimises the sum of Kendall tau distances to all input rankings. It is considered majoritarian in the sense that if more than 50% of the input rankings are identical, then the method will necessarily return that ranking.

== Proportional methods ==
In some contexts it may be desirable to aggregate rankings in a more proportional manner, that also takes minority rankings into account. There are several approaches to this problem.

1. Lederer, Peters and Was present the Squared Kemeny method. It minimises the sum of squared Kendall-tau distances to all input rankings. This approach guarantees an upper bound on the distance between the output ranking and any input ranking, depending on its frequency in the input. This provides a non-trivial guarantee even for minority rankings.

2. Aziz, Lederer, Peters, Peters and Ritossa present the Solid Coalition Refinement rule. It is a multiwinner voting rule that satisfies committee monotonicity. Hence, it can be used as a rank aggregation rule: the outcome for k=1 is the first in the ranking; the outcome for k=2 is the second in the ranking; and so on. For every k, the top k candidates in the resulting ranking satisfy a fairness property called Proportionality for Solid Coalitions.

== See also ==
- Ranked voting – a setting in which the input consists of rankings of candidates, and the goal is to select a single candidate or a subset of candidates rather than produce a full ranking (examples are Single transferable vote and expanding approvals rule).
- Arrow's impossibility theorem – a fundamental result in social choice theory concerning the limitations of ranked voting systems.
- Social welfare function – a function that takes individual preferences as input and produces a collective ranking of alternatives.
