= Economic justice =

Subcategory of welfare economics

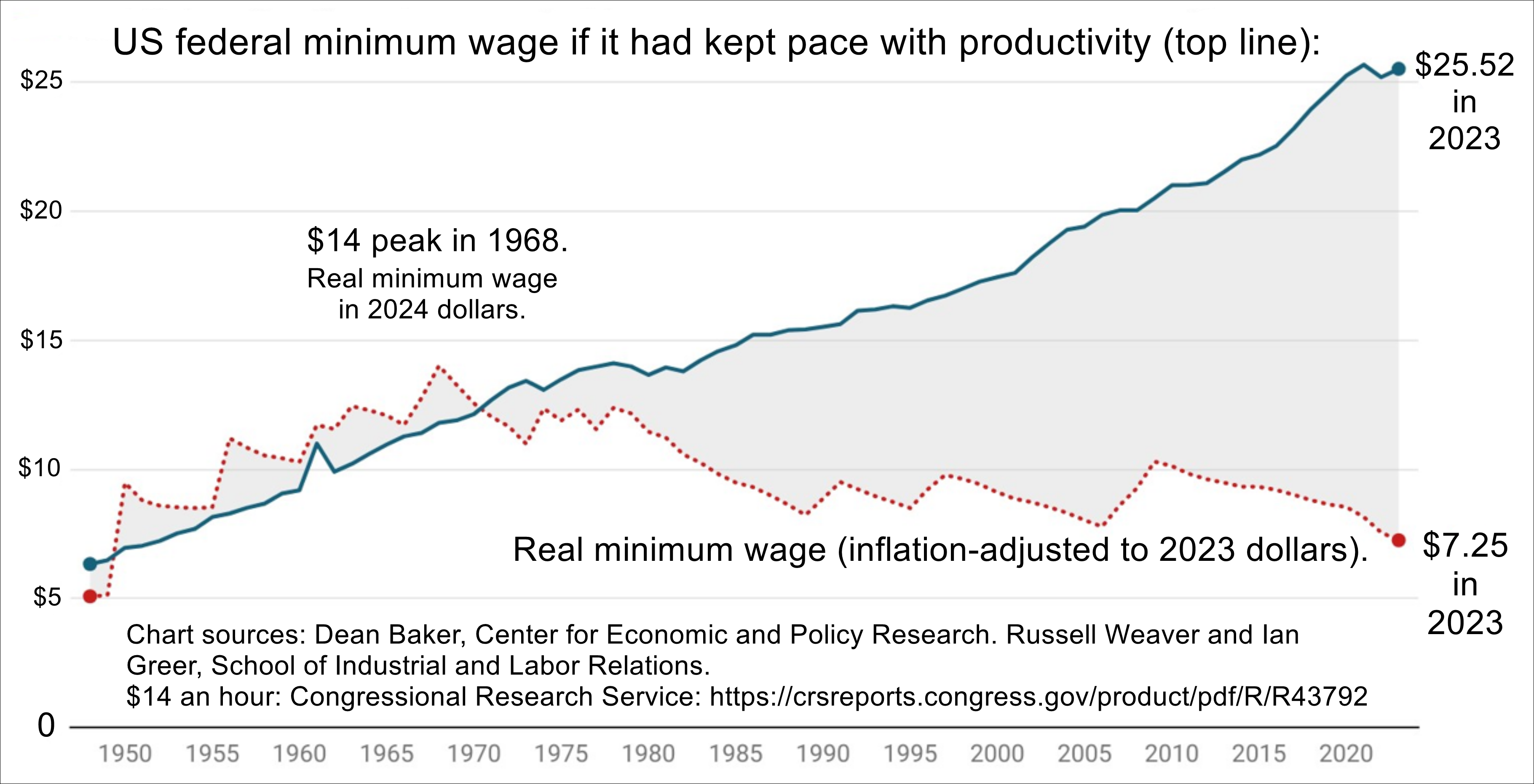
US federal minimum wage if it had kept pace with productivity compared to the real minimum wage

Economic justice is generally understood as distributive justice and equality of outcome and sometimes a component of social justice in a normative sense, as several economic theories and approaches provide insights into understanding distributive justice. Economic justice is the desired outcome of just and fair economic institutions, with the ultimate goal of providing a sufficient material foundation for a dignified, productive, and creative life. What is just and fair remains deeply contested, often along political affiliations. Welfare economics traditionally is normative economics, generically speaking, and has since come to be associated with a particular subdomain in economics.

Some ideas about justice and ethics overlap with the origins of economic thought, often as to distributive justice and sometimes as to Marxist analysis. The subject is a topic of normative economics and philosophy and economics. In early welfare economics, where it was mentioned, 'justice' was little distinguished from maximization of all individual utility functions or a social welfare function. As to the latter, Paul Samuelson (1947), expanding on the work of Abram Bergson, represents a social welfare function in general terms as any ethical belief system required to order any (hypothetically feasible) social states for the entire society as "better than", "worse than", or "indifferent to" each other. Kenneth Arrow (1963) showed a difficulty of trying to extend a social welfare function consistently across different hypothetical ordinal utility functions, even aside from considerations of justice. Utility maximization survives, even with the rise of ordinal-utility/Pareto theory, as an ethical basis for economic policy judgments in the wealth-maximization criterion invoked in law and economics.

Amartya Sen (1970), Kenneth Arrow (1983), Serge-Christophe Kolm (1969, 1996, 2000), and others have considered ways in which utilitarianism as an approach to justice is constrained or challenged by independent claims of equality in the distribution of primary goods, liberty, entitlements, opportunity, exclusion of antisocial preferences, possible capabilities, and fairness as non-envy plus Pareto efficiency. Alternative approaches consider how to combine concern for the worst off with economic efficiency, the notion of personal responsibility and the merits and drawbacks of reducing individual benefits, claims of intergenerational justice, and other non-welfarist/Pareto approaches. Justice is a subarea of social choice theory, for example in work on extended sympathy, and more generally in the work of Arrow, Sen, and others.

A broad reinterpretation of justice from the perspective of game theory, social contract theory, and evolutionary naturalism is found in the works of Ken Binmore (1994, 1998, 2004) and others, who have invoked arguments on fairness as an aspect of justice to explain a wide range of behavioral and theoretical applications, supplementing earlier emphasis on economic efficiency.

== See also ==
- Constitutional economics
- Economic inequality
- Economic security
- Pareto efficiency
- Poverty reduction
- Social equality
