= Theory of the two demons =

Moral equation of the Argentine Junta and guerrilla opposition

The theory of the two demons (Spanish: Teoría de los dos demonios) is a rhetorical device used in Argentine political discourse to disqualify arguments that appear to morally equate violent political subversion with illegal repressive activities carried out by the state.

Since the end of the Argentine military dictatorship (euphemistically called "National Reorganization Process") and the Dirty War, when guerrilla groups (mainly left-wing Peronist Montoneros and the Marxist-Leninist Ejército Revolucionario del Pueblo or ERP) were persecuted by the armed forces (together with law enforcement agencies and paramilitary groups), this term has been in wide use by people mainly in human rights movements, the political left, and former guerrilla members and supporters. These people argue that a national state, even one controlled by a de facto government, cannot be compared to a guerrilla or other subversive group, the difference being precisely that the institutions of a national state are supposed to act within the confines of law, even when using violence to fight outlaws.

The term "theory of the two demons" is used pejoratively in left-wing discourse, and is attached to public personalities who plead to support "national reconciliation", sometimes appealing to the Christian idea of "forgive and forget", while (allegedly) having ulterior intentions. Since the image of the military has been tarnished by human rights abuses, economic chaos and the Falklands War defeat, accusers claim that advocates of right-wing repression must resort to reconciliation rhetoric, because a plain admission of support would disqualify them in the eyes of most Argentines.

== Background ==
Starting with the kidnapping and assassination of former de facto President Pedro Aramburu by the Montoneros in 1970, armed violence by left-wing groups increased. Some argued for the legitimacy of armed struggle on one or more of the following arguments:

- Argentina was under a military dictatorship.
- The government outlawed political parties and persecuted all forms of dissent, sometimes through violent means.
- Juan Perón, the leader of a vast mass of Argentines, was in exile and forbidden to re-enter the political arena.

The Cuban revolution lent a romantic aura to armed struggle, and many young people found themselves sympathizing with the guerrillas or with left-wing Peronist organizations such as Juventud Peronista (JP), which had a radicalized wing named Tendencia Revolucionaria ("Revolutionary Tendency", sometimes shortened to La Tendencia) which was subject to Montoneros' influence.

It can be argued that none of these groups attempted to terrorize the general populace through random violence. Yet, Montoneros killed notable persons who were not guilty of violence against the people (such as Arturo Mor Roig, the architect of the 1973 democratic transition, labor union leader José Ignacio Rucci. General consensus is that Montoneros carried out assassinations, and their supporters boasted of these, but the organization did not formally claim responsibility for them.) Some operations resulted in the deaths of conscript soldiers or lower-ranking policemen, who could not be held responsible for the alleged crimes of their superiors. Some attacks resulted in the deaths of the families or friends of military officers.

== Justification for the criticism ==
Many have condemned the violence of the guerrilla radical groups (the ends, the means, or both), but feel that the atrocities committed by the armed forces and their associates during the Dirty War that started on 1976 have a different moral status, since the Argentine state under the armed forces dictatorship sought to terrorize the citizenry by means of kidnapping and forced disappearance of persons without trial or recourse of habeas corpus.

The main criticism of the state's measures, as mentioned above, is that a national state is expected to enforce the law and respect human rights, even when repressing violent criminals that do not show such respect. Moreover, Argentine state terrorism included the illegal arrest and disappearance of high-school students asking for a rebate in public transportation, nuns who assisted the poor, and persons who happened to be on a guerrilla's telephone list.

== After the restoration of democracy ==
The Argentine military and other people have expressed different opinions on the Dirty War. A few among the military involved have conceded that their actions were morally wrong and unjustifiable. A number of them have fully acknowledged their commitment and expressed no regrets. A third group refers to the crimes of the military as "excesses", implying that the country was in fact undergoing a war, with two sides fighting for different goals, so that certain objectionable outcomes were inevitably bound to occur, "as in all wars".

Democratic forces were united in their criticism of the military in the run-up to the restoration of democracy in 1983. Less than three months after the inauguration of President Raúl Alfonsín, several critiques of Montoneros arose from within the democratic spectrum. Firstly, Montoneros, la soberbia armada (ISBN 950-37-0018-3), a book written by the leftist journalist Pablo Giussani, that compared Montoneros to European extreme-left terror organizations. Then, a comprehensive and documented effort by British historian Richard Gillespie titled Montoneros, Soldados de Perón was widely read and contributed to cement a non-romantic image of Montoneros. Juan José Sebreli invested a whole chapter of his Los deseos imaginarios del peronismo (ISBN 950-37-0018-3) to Montoneros, calling it "left-wing fascism". A few years later, Silvia Sigal and Eliseo Verón deconstructed the (verbal) opposition between Perón and Montoneros in the third section of Perón o muerte. Los fundamentos discursivos del fenómeno peronista.

Alfonsín put the military juntas on trial, and prosecuted Montoneros leaders as well, as well as people accused of "illicit organization" with the Montoneros, such as Ricardo Obregón Cano, former Peronist governor of Cordoba deposed in a police coup in February 1974, and sentenced to ten years' prison in 1985. Under the Alfonsín administration, a state committee inquired into the disappearances. When its report was delivered to the government, the Interior Minister, Antonio Tróccoli, gave a speech equating Dirty War criminals and terrorists that was criticized by the leftist and Peronist opposition as an exponent of the "doctrine of the two demons".

In 1989, President Carlos Menem pardoned both the military commanders and the guerilla leaders.

After taking office in 2003, the Néstor Kirchner administration shifted the focus towards the uncovering and punishment of crimes of the Dirty War, including those formerly covered by the now-repealed amnesty laws passed in the mid-1980s. In August 2005, a judge struck Menem's pardons as unconstitutional, and a final pronouncement of the Supreme Court on the matter is expected soon.

=== The CONADEP report ===
In 1984, the National Commission on the Disappearance of Persons (CONADEP) published a report titled Nunca Más (Never Again) with extensive research about instances of forced disappearance during the dictatorship. It started with a prologue which read:

During the 1970s, Argentina was convulsed by a terror that came from both the far right and the far left, a phenomenon that has occurred in many other countries. This also happened in Italy, which for many years had to endure the ruthless actions of fascist groups, the Red Brigades and similar organizations. But that nation never at any time abandoned the principles of the rule of law to combat it, and did so with absolute effectiveness, through the ordinary courts, offering the accused all the guarantees of due process; and on the occasion of the kidnapping of Aldo Moro, when a member of the security services proposed to General Della Chiesa that a detainee who seemed to know a great deal be tortured, he replied with memorable words: "Italy can allow itself to lose Aldo Moro. Not, however, to implement torture."
This was not the case in our country: to the crimes of the terrorists, the Armed Forces responded with a terrorism infinitely worse than that which was fought, because from 24 March 1976 they had the power and impunity of the absolute state, kidnapping, torturing and murdering thousands of human beings.

— Ernesto Sabato

That phrase, written by Ernesto Sabato is often cited as representative of theory of the two demons.

Researcher Elizabeth Jelin states regarding the original version of the prologue:

There it speaks of the two violences, but not in terms of equivalence (the usual interpretation—in my view mistaken—that gave rise to the "theory of the two demons") but in terms of an "escalation of violences": there was guerrilla violence that provoked a much more brutal repression. And it was a moment in which the political-cultural climate was one of condemnation of violence.

— Elizabeth Jelin

For his part, Martín Granovsky opined regarding the work of the prosecution in the Trial of the Juntas:

"Contrary to some circulating stereotypes, little attached to the facts, the work of the prosecution did not draw on the theory of the two demons but, in line with the CONADEP, dissected the demon of state terrorism until making it visible in all its facets and in some of its social impacts"

— Martín Granovsky

Juan Gelman argues:

What demonstrates that the theory of the two demons does not work is the fact that there were 30,000 disappeared. According to a study by Colonel Florencio García and the army there were at most 1,500 guerrillas, counting all the guerrilla groups in the country. Thus, assuming that all those guerrillas had been annihilated by the armed forces, it still remains to ask what happened to the 28,500 who were not guerrillas and who were even not in favor, but rather opposed to armed struggle as a solution to the country's problems.

As can be seen, this argument by Gelman is based on the premise of assuming as true the number of 30,000 disappeared. It also contradicts the conclusions of the courts which, in the judgment of case 13/84, established that at its peak, the guerrilla organizations had a number close to 25,000 adherents, of whom 15,000 were combatants.

It is attributed that this theory has been supported by figures such as Alejandro Rozitchner, Norma Morandini, Graciela Fernández Meijide, and Héctor Leis, Magdalena Ruiz Guiñazú, Cecilia Pando, Albano Harguindeguy, among others.

Marcelo Zanotti, in Diario 5, establishes a distinction between the theory of the two demons and what he calls a "chain of revenge", in which opposing sides, aligned with different ideological positions, sought to impose their interests through excessive and immature violence.

==== New edition ====
For a new edition of the CONADEP report presented at the Buenos Aires Book Fair of 2006, the Human Rights Secretariat added a paragraph stating the following:

"It is necessary to leave it clearly established [...] that it is unacceptable to attempt to justify State terrorism as a sort of game of counteracting violences, as if it were possible to look for a justifying symmetry in the action of individuals faced with the Nation and the State's estrangement from their proper goals."

This led to a reaction from original members of the CONADEP, covered by journalistic sources. For example, journalist Magdalena Ruiz Guiñazú, a former member of CONADEP, criticized the new prologue: "It is a grave historical mistake to think that the report was an apology of the theory of the two demons." Former President Alfonsín endorsed Ruiz Guiñazú's opinion and claimed that the addition of the prologue "shows a dangerous tendency to re-invent history".

On the other hand, Roberto Berdún, who was in charge of the archive of CONADEP and of the Subsecretariat of Human Rights under the government of Alfonsín, recalled the race against time to refine the annex of victims and noted that the day before its formal delivery he unsuccessfully asked Ernesto Sabato, Graciela Fernández Meijide and Magdalena Ruiz Guiñazú to postpone publication in order to correct errors. "It was published as it was and to this day it is used politically," he lamented. "It is terrible to see Graciela say that the correction of the prologue was aberrant. It was a necessary historical reparation that Duhalde came to settle. A prologue with the theory of the two demons was inadmissible when the 500 pages that follow show that state terrorism was the only demon." President Néstor Kirchner was responsible for the modification of the prologue of the book "Nunca Más":

Eduardo Luis Duhalde said that it is necessary to clearly establish, because it is required for the construction of the future on firm foundations, that it is unacceptable to attempt to justify state terrorism as a kind of game of opposing violences as if it were possible to seek a justificatory symmetry in the actions of individuals in the face of the abandonment of the proper aims of the Nation and the State, which are inalienable."

Human Rights Secretary Eduardo Luis Duhalde justified the change saying that "the original prologue did not match the political philosophy that the State supports today with regards to the prosecution of crimes against humanity".

== Theory of the two demons in Uruguay ==
This "theory" has also been widely discussed in Uruguay, in a local version in which, on the one hand, the actions of the state repressive apparatus are considered, and on the other, the Tupamaro guerrilla. One of its most emphatic proponents was former president Julio María Sanguinetti.

== See also ==
- CONADEP
- Dirty War
- Forced disappearance
- Montoneros
- Mothers of the Plaza de Mayo
- National Reorganization Process
