= Social justice =

Concept in political philosophy

Social justice is justice in relation to the distribution of wealth, opportunities, and privileges within a society where individuals' rights are recognized and protected. In Western and Asian cultures, the concept of social justice has often referred to the process of ensuring that individuals fulfill their societal roles and receive their due from society. In the current movements for social justice, the emphasis has been on the breaking of barriers for social mobility, the creation of safety nets, and economic justice. Social justice assigns rights and duties in the institutions of society, which enables people to receive the basic benefits and burdens of cooperation. The relevant institutions often include taxation, social insurance, public health, public school, public services, labor law and regulation of markets, to ensure distribution of wealth, and equal opportunity.

Modernist interpretations that relate justice to a reciprocal relationship to society are mediated by differences in cultural traditions, some of which emphasize the individual responsibility toward society and others the equilibrium between access to power and its responsible use. Hence, social justice is invoked today while reinterpreting historical figures such as Bartolomé de las Casas, in philosophical debates about differences among human beings, in efforts for gender, ethnic, and social equality, for advocating justice for migrants, prisoners, the environment, and the physically and developmentally disabled.

While concepts of social justice can be found in classical and Christian philosophical sources, from early Greek philosophers Plato and Aristotle to Catholic saints Augustine of Hippo and Thomas Aquinas, the term social justice finds its earliest uses in the late eighteenth century, albeit with unclear theoretical or practical meanings. The use of the term was subject to accusations of rhetorical flourish, perhaps related to amplifying one view of distributive justice. In the coining and definition of the term in the natural law social scientific treatise of Luigi Taparelli, in the early 1840s, Taparelli established the natural law principle that corresponded to the evangelical principle of brotherly love—i.e. social justice reflects the duty one has to one's other self in the interdependent abstract unity of the human person in society. After the Revolutions of 1848, the term was popularized generically through the writings of Antonio Rosmini-Serbati.

In the late industrial revolution, Progressive Era American legal scholars began to use the term more, particularly Louis Brandeis and Roscoe Pound. From the early 20th century it was also embedded in international law and institutions; the preamble to establish the International Labour Organization recalled that "universal and lasting peace can be established only if it is based upon social justice." In the later 20th century, social justice was made central to the philosophy of the social contract, primarily by John Rawls in A Theory of Justice (1971). In 1993, the Vienna Declaration and Programme of Action treats social justice as a purpose of human rights education.

== History ==
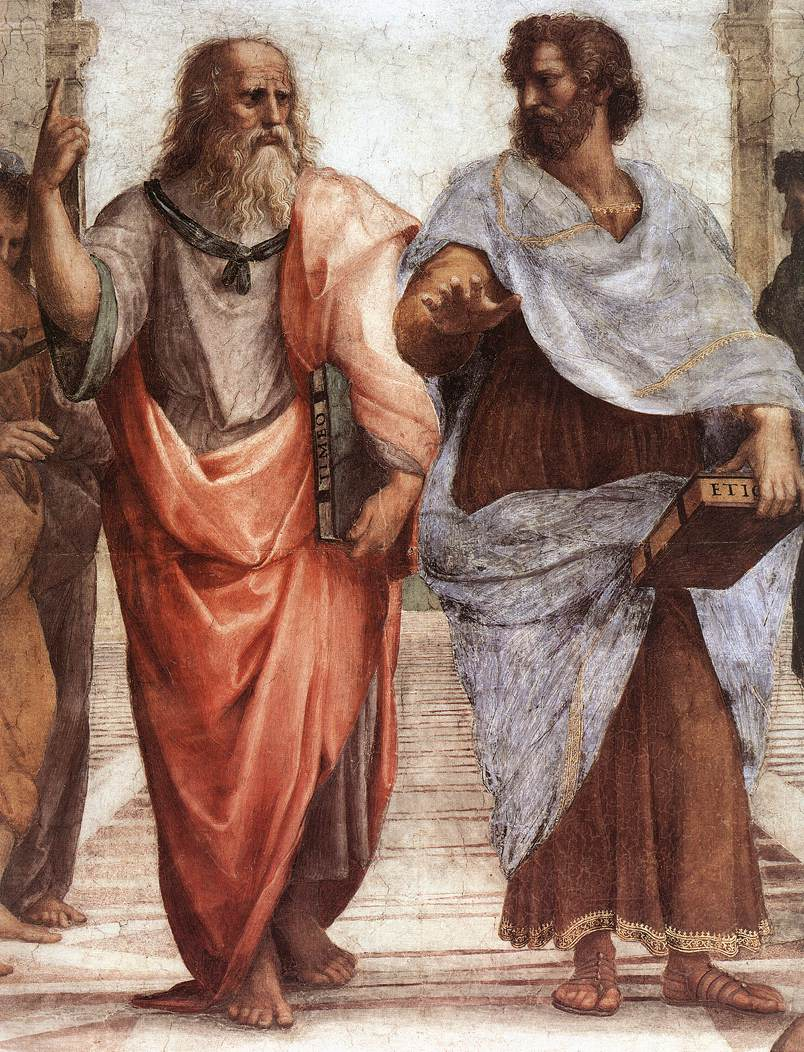
Plato and Aristotle depicted in The School of Athens

The different concepts of justice, as discussed in ancient Western philosophy, were typically centered upon the community.

- Plato wrote in The Republic that it would be an ideal state that "every member of the community must be assigned to the class for which he finds himself best fitted." In an article for J.N.V University, author D.R. Bhandari says, "Justice is, for Plato, at once a part of human virtue and the bond, which joins man together in society. It is the identical quality that makes good and social. Justice is an order and duty of the parts of the soul, it is to the soul as health is to the body. Plato says that justice is not mere strength, but it is a harmonious strength. Justice is not the right of the stronger but the effective harmony of the whole. All moral conceptions revolve about the good of the whole-individual as well as social".
- Plato believed rights existed only between free people, and the law should take "account in the first instance of relations of inequality in which individuals are treated in proportion to their worth and only secondarily of relations of equality." Reflecting this time when slavery and subjugation of women was typical, ancient views of justice tended to reflect the rigid class systems that still prevailed. On the other hand, for the privileged groups, strong concepts of fairness and the community existed. Distributive justice was said by Aristotle to require that people were distributed goods and assets according to their merit.
- Socrates (through Plato's dialogue Crito) is credited with developing the idea of a social contract, whereby people ought to follow the rules of a society, and accept its burdens because they have accepted its benefits. During the Middle Ages, religious scholars particularly, such as Thomas Aquinas continued discussion of justice in various ways, but ultimately connected being a good citizen to the purpose of serving God. The Waldensians were a medieval sect that advocated for social justice.

After the Renaissance and Reformation, the modern concept of social justice, as developing human potential, began to emerge through the work of a series of authors. Baruch Spinoza in On the Improvement of the Understanding (1677) contended that the one true aim of life should be to acquire "a human character much more stable than [one's] own", and to achieve this "pitch of perfection... The chief good is that he should arrive, together with other individuals if possible, at the possession of the aforesaid character." During the enlightenment and responding to the French and American Revolutions, Thomas Paine similarly wrote in The Rights of Man (1792) society should give "genius a fair and universal chance" and so "the construction of government ought to be such as to bring forward... all that extent of capacity which never fails to appear in revolutions."

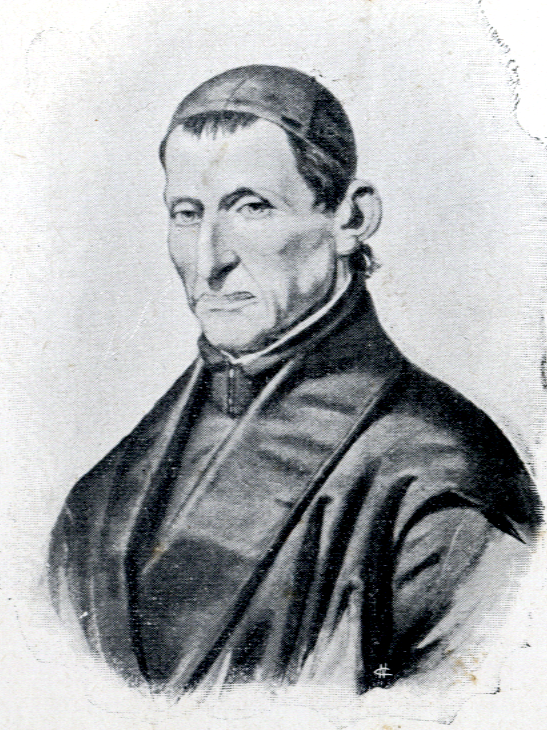
Social justice has been traditionally credited to be coined by Jesuit priest Luigi Taparelli in the 1840s, though the expression is older.

Although there is no certainty about the first use of the term "social justice", early sources can be found in Europe in the 18th century. Some references to the use of the expression are in articles of journals aligned with the spirit of the Enlightenment, in which social justice is described as an obligation of the monarch; also the term is present in books written by Catholic Italian theologians, notably members of the Society of Jesus. Thus, according to these sources and the context, social justice was another term for "the justice of society", the justice that rules the relations among individuals in society, without any mention to socio-economic equity or human dignity.

The usage of the term started to become more frequent by Catholic thinkers from the 1840s, beginning with the Jesuit Luigi Taparelli in Civiltà Cattolica, and based on the work of St. Thomas Aquinas. Taparelli argued that rival capitalist and socialist theories, based on subjective Cartesian thinking, undermined the unity of society present in Thomistic metaphysics as neither were sufficiently concerned with ethics. Writing in 1861, the influential British philosopher and economist, John Stuart Mill stated in Utilitarianism his view that "Society should treat all equally well who have deserved equally well of it, that is, who have deserved equally well absolutely. This is the highest abstract standard of social and distributive justice; towards which all institutions, and the efforts of all virtuous citizens, should be made in the utmost degree to converge."

In the later 19th and early 20th century, social justice became an important theme in American political and legal philosophy, particularly in the work of John Dewey, Roscoe Pound and Louis Brandeis. One of the prime concerns was the Lochner era decisions of the US Supreme Court to strike down legislation passed by state governments and the Federal government for social and economic improvement, such as the eight-hour day or the right to join a trade union. After the First World War, the founding document of the International Labour Organization took up the same terminology in its preamble, stating that "peace can be established only if it is based on social justice". From this point, the discussion of social justice entered into mainstream legal and academic discourse.

In 1931, the Pope Pius XI explicitly referred to the expression, along with the concept of subsidiarity, for the first time in Catholic social teaching in the encyclical Quadragesimo anno. Then again in Divini Redemptoris, the church pointed out that the realization of social justice relied on the promotion of the dignity of human person. Social Justice was the name of Charles Coughlin's newspaper. Because of the documented influence of Divini Redemptoris in its drafters, the Constitution of Ireland was the first one to establish the term as a principle of the economy in the State, and then other countries around the world did the same throughout the 20th century, even in socialist regimes such as the Cuban Constitution in 1976.

In the late 20th century, several liberal and conservative thinkers, notably Friedrich Hayek rejected the concept by stating that it did not mean anything, or meant too many things. However the concept remained highly influential, particularly with its promotion by philosophers such as John Rawls. Even though the meaning of social justice varies, at least three common elements can be identified in the contemporary theories about it: a duty of the State to distribute certain vital means (such as economic, social, and cultural rights), the protection of human dignity, and affirmative actions to promote substantive equality and social equity for everybody.

== Contemporary theory ==
=== Philosophical perspectives ===
==== Cosmic values ====
Hunter Lewis' work promoting natural healthcare and sustainable economies advocates for conservation as a key premise in social justice. His manifesto on sustainability ties the continued thriving of human life to real conditions, the environment supporting that life, and associates injustice with the detrimental effects of unintended consequences of human actions. Quoting classical Greek thinkers like Epicurus on the good of pursuing happiness, Hunter also cites ornithologist, naturalist, and philosopher Alexander Skutch in his book Moral Foundations:

The common feature which unites the activities most consistently forbidden by the moral codes of civilized peoples is that by their very nature they cannot be both habitual and enduring, because they tend to destroy the conditions which make them possible.

Pope Benedict XVI cites Teilhard de Chardin in a vision of the cosmos as a 'living host' embracing an understanding of ecology that includes humanity's relationship to others, that pollution affects not just the natural world but interpersonal relations as well. Cosmic harmony, justice and peace are closely interrelated:

If you want to cultivate peace, protect creation.

In The Quest for Cosmic Justice, Thomas Sowell writes that seeking utopia, while admirable, may have disastrous effects if done without strong consideration of the economic underpinnings that support contemporary society.

==== John Rawls ====
Political philosopher John Rawls draws on the utilitarian insights of Bentham and Mill, the social contract ideas of John Locke, and the categorical imperative ideas of Kant. His first statement of principle was made in A Theory of Justice where he proposed that, "Each person possesses an inviolability founded on justice that even the welfare of society as a whole cannot override. For this reason justice denies that the loss of freedom for some is made right by a greater good shared by others." A deontological proposition that echoes Kant in framing the moral good of justice in absolutist terms. His views are definitively restated in Political Liberalism where society is seen "as a fair system of co-operation over time, from one generation to the next".

All societies have a basic structure of social, economic, and political institutions, both formal and informal. In testing how well these elements fit and work together, Rawls based a key test of legitimacy on the theories of social contract. To determine whether any particular system of collectively enforced social arrangements is legitimate, he argued that one must look for agreement by the people who are subject to it, but not necessarily to an objective notion of justice based on coherent ideological grounding. Not every citizen can be asked to participate in a poll to determine his or her consent to every proposal in which some degree of coercion is involved, so one has to assume that all citizens are reasonable. Rawls constructed an argument for a two-stage process to determine a citizen's hypothetical agreement:

- The citizen agrees to be represented by X for certain purposes, and, to that extent, X holds these powers as a trustee for the citizen.
- X agrees that enforcement in a particular social context is legitimate. The citizen, therefore, is bound by this decision because it is the function of the trustee to represent the citizen in this way.

This applies to one person who represents a small group (e.g., the organiser of a social event setting a dress code) just as it does to national governments, which are ultimate trustees, holding representative powers for the benefit of all citizens within their territorial boundaries. Governments that fail to provide for welfare of their citizens according to the principles of justice are not legitimate. In the Canadian context, social justice is realized through the liberal welfare state. The aim here is to combat inequality and provide people with basic social services such as health care, education, and social insurance. To emphasise the general principle that justice should rise from the people and not be dictated by the law-making powers of governments, Rawls asserted that, "There is ... a general presumption against imposing legal and other restrictions on conduct without sufficient reason. But this presumption creates no special priority for any particular liberty." This is support for an unranked set of liberties that reasonable citizens in all states should respect and uphold — to some extent, the list proposed by Rawls matches the normative human rights that have international recognition and direct enforcement in some nation states where the citizens need encouragement to act in a way that fixes a greater degree of equality of outcome. According to Rawls, the basic liberties that every good society should guarantee are:

- Freedom of thought;
- Liberty of conscience as it affects social relationships on the grounds of religion, philosophy, and morality;
- Political liberties (e.g., representative democratic institutions, freedom of speech and the press, and freedom of assembly);
- Freedom of association;
- Freedoms necessary for the liberty and integrity of the person (namely: freedom from slavery, freedom of movement and a reasonable degree of freedom to choose one's occupation); and
- Rights and liberties covered by the rule of law.

Some writers argue that social justice is not only about how resources are shared, but also about the importance of work and participation in community life. Andrew Sayer calls this contributive justice, connecting fairness to meaningful contribution and dignity. Social-policy researcher John Hudson emphasizes that the design of welfare systems affects how justice is realized, as such structures determine people's access to resources and equality.

==== Thomas Pogge ====
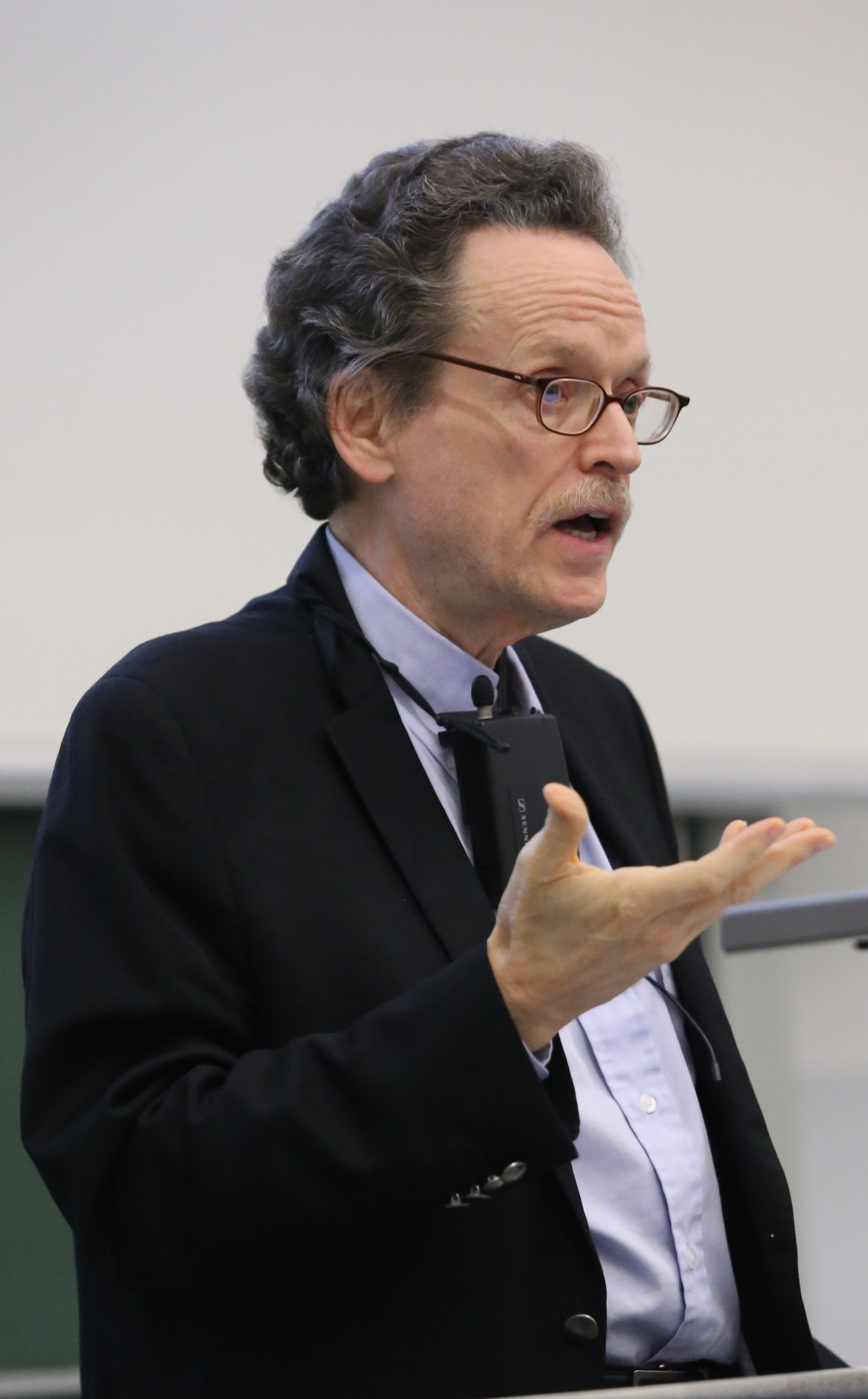
Thomas Pogge

Thomas Pogge's arguments pertain to a standard of social justice that creates human rights deficits. He assigns responsibility to those who actively cooperate in designing or imposing the social institution, that the order is foreseeable as harming the global poor and is reasonably avoidable. Pogge argues that social institutions have a negative duty to not harm the poor.

Pogge speaks of "institutional cosmopolitanism" and assigns responsibility to institutional schemes for deficits of human rights. An example given is slavery and third parties. A third party should not recognize or enforce slavery. The institutional order should be held responsible only for deprivations of human rights that it establishes or authorizes. The current institutional design, he says, systematically harms developing economies by enabling corporate tax evasion, illicit financial flows, corruption, trafficking of people and weapons. Joshua Cohen disputes his claims based on the fact that some poor countries have done well with the current institutional design. Elizabeth Kahn argues that some of these responsibilities should apply globally.

=== United Nations ===
The United Nations calls social justice "an underlying principle for peaceful and prosperous coexistence within and among nations.

The United Nations' 2006 document Social Justice in an Open World: The Role of the United Nations, states that "Social justice may be broadly understood as the fair and compassionate distribution of the fruits of economic growth ..."

The term "social justice" was seen by the U.N. "as a substitute for the protection of human rights [and] first appeared in United Nations texts during the second half of the 1960s. At the initiative of the Soviet Union, and with the support of developing countries, the term was used in the Declaration on Social Progress and Development, adopted in 1969."

The same document reports, "From the comprehensive global perspective shaped by the United Nations Charter and the Universal Declaration of Human Rights, neglect of the pursuit of social justice in all its dimensions translates into de facto acceptance of a future marred by violence, repression and chaos." The report concludes, "Social justice is not possible without strong and coherent redistributive policies conceived and implemented by public agencies."

The same UN document offers a concise history: "[T]he notion of social justice is relatively new. None of history's great philosophers—not Plato or Aristotle, or Confucius or Averroes, or even Rousseau or Kant—saw the need to consider justice or the redress of injustices from a social perspective. The concept first surfaced in Western thought and political language in the wake of the industrial revolution and the parallel development of the socialist doctrine. It emerged as an expression of protest against what was perceived as the capitalist exploitation of labor and as a focal point for the development of measures to improve the human condition. It was born as a revolutionary slogan embodying the ideals of progress and fraternity. Following the revolutions that shook Europe in the mid-1800s, social justice became a rallying cry for progressive thinkers and political activists.... By the mid-twentieth century, the concept of social justice had become central to the ideologies and programs of virtually all the leftist and centrist political parties around the world ..."

Another key area of human rights and social justice is the United Nations's defense of children's rights worldwide. In 1989, the Convention on the Rights of the Child was adopted and available for signature, ratification and accession by General Assembly resolution 44/25. According to OHCHR, this convention entered into force on 2 September 1990. This convention upholds that all states have the obligation to "protect the child from all forms of physical or mental violence, injury or abuse, neglect or negligent treatment, maltreatment or exploitation, including sexual abuse."

== Religious perspectives ==
=== Abrahamic religions ===
==== Christianity ====
===== Evangelicalism =====
Time magazine noted that younger Evangelicals also increasingly engage in social justice. John Stott traced the call for social justice back to the cross, "The cross is a revelation of God's justice as well as of his love. That is why the community of the cross should concern itself with social justice as well as with loving philanthropy."

====== Methodism ======
From its founding, Methodism was a Christian social justice movement. Under John Wesley's direction, Methodists became leaders in many social justice issues of the day, including the prison reform and abolition movements. Wesley himself was among the first to preach for slaves rights, attracting significant opposition.

Today, social justice plays a major role in the United Methodist Church and the Free Methodist Church. The Book of Discipline of the United Methodist Church says, "We hold governments responsible for the protection of the rights of the people to free and fair elections and to the freedoms of speech, religion, assembly, communications media, and petition for redress of grievances without fear of reprisal; to the right to privacy; and to the guarantee of the rights to adequate food, clothing, shelter, education, and health care." The United Methodist Church also teaches population control as part of its doctrine.

===== Catholicism =====
Catholic social teaching consists of those aspects of Roman Catholic doctrine which relate to matters dealing with the respect of the individual human life. A distinctive feature of Catholic social doctrine is its concern for the poorest and most vulnerable members of society. Two of the seven key areas of "Catholic social teaching" are pertinent to social justice:

- Life and dignity of the human person: The foundational principle of all Catholic social teaching is the sanctity of all human life and the inherent dignity of every human person, from conception to natural death. Human life must be valued above all material possessions.
- Preferential option for the poor and vulnerable: Catholics believe Jesus taught that on the Day of Judgement God will ask what each person did to help the poor and needy: "Amen, I say to you, whatever you did for one of these least brothers of mine, you did for me." The Catholic Church believes that through words, prayers and deeds one must show solidarity with, and compassion for, the poor. The moral test of any society is "how it treats its most vulnerable members. The poor have the most urgent moral claim on the conscience of the nation. People are called to look at public policy decisions in terms of how they affect the poor."

Modern Catholic social teaching is often thought to have begun with the encyclicals of Pope Leo XIII.

- Pope Leo XIII, who studied under Taparelli, published in 1891 the encyclical Rerum novarum (On the Condition of the Working Classes; lit. "On new things"), rejecting both socialism and capitalism, while defending labor unions and private property. He stated that society should be based on cooperation and not class conflict and competition. In this document, Leo set out the Catholic Church's response to the social instability and labor conflict that had arisen in the wake of industrialization and had led to the rise of socialism. The Pope advocated that the role of the state was to promote social justice through the protection of rights, while the church must speak out on social issues to teach correct social principles and ensure class harmony.
- The encyclical Quadragesimo anno (On Reconstruction of the Social Order, literally "in the fortieth year") of 1931 by Pope Pius XI, encourages a living wage, subsidiarity, and advocates that social justice is a personal virtue as well as an attribute of the social order, saying that society can be just only if individuals and institutions are just.
- Pope John Paul II added much to the corpus of the Catholic social teaching, penning three encyclicals which focus on issues such as economics, politics, geo-political situations, ownership of the means of production, private property and the "social mortgage", and private property. The encyclicals Laborem exercens, Sollicitudo rei socialis, and Centesimus annus are just a small portion of his overall contribution to Catholic social justice. Pope John Paul II was a strong advocate of justice and human rights, and spoke forcefully for the poor. He addresses issues such as the problems that technology can present should it be misused, and admits a fear that the "progress" of the world is not true progress at all, if it should denigrate the value of the human person. He argued in Centesimus annus that private property, markets, and honest labor were the keys to alleviating the miseries of the poor and to enabling a life that can express the fullness of the human person.
- Pope Benedict XVI's encyclical Deus caritas est ("God is Love") of 2006 claims that justice is the defining concern of the state and the central concern of politics, and not of the church, which has charity as its central social concern. It said that the laity has the specific responsibility of pursuing social justice in civil society and that the church's active role in social justice should be to inform the debate, using reason and natural law, and also by providing moral and spiritual formation for those involved in politics.
- The official Catholic doctrine on social justice can be found in the book Compendium of the Social Doctrine of the Church, published in 2004 and updated in 2006, by the Pontifical Council Iustitia et Pax.

The Catechism of the Catholic Church (§§ 1928–1948) contains more detail of the church's view of social justice.

==== Islam ====
In Muslim history, Islamic governance has often been associated with social justice. Establishment of social justice was one of the motivating factors of the Abbasid revolt against the Umayyads. The Shi'a believe that the return of the Mahdi will herald in "the messianic age of justice" and the Mahdi along with the Isa (Jesus) will end plunder, torture, oppression and discrimination.

For the Muslim Brotherhood the implementation of social justice would require the rejection of consumerism and communism. The Brotherhood strongly affirmed the right to private property as well as differences in personal wealth due to factors such as hard work. However, the Brotherhood held Muslims had an obligation to assist those Muslims in need. It held that zakat (alms-giving) was not voluntary charity, but rather the poor had the right to assistance from the more fortunate. Most Islamic governments therefore enforce the zakat through taxes.

==== Judaism ====
In To Heal a Fractured World: The Ethics of Responsibility, Rabbi Jonathan Sacks states that social justice has a central place in Judaism. One of Judaism's most distinctive and challenging ideas is its ethics of responsibility reflected in the concepts of simcha ("gladness" or "joy"), tzedakah ("the religious obligation to perform charity and philanthropic acts"), chesed ("deeds of kindness"), and tikkun olam ("repairing the world").

==== Baháʼí Faith ====
The Baháʼí Faith teaches that the purpose of justice is to bring about the unity of the human race; the oneness of humanity, together with justice, stands at the center of Baháʼuʼlláh's teachings. Justice in the Baháʼí Faith is understood both as a personal capacity, exercised by investigating the truth for oneself rather than relying on the judgment of others, and as a social standard under which everyone has an equal claim to the same rights and opportunities. The individual's sense of justice is considered an inherent capacity that must be developed through moral and intellectual education rather than one that emerges on its own. The scholars Michael Karlberg and Derik Smith characterize the religion's social ideal as contributive justice: social arrangements that enable every person and group to contribute to the good of the whole, on which the flourishing of each in turn depends. Baháʼí teachings hold women and men to be equal. They also treat extremes of wealth and poverty as unjust: ʻAbduʼl-Bahá, Baháʼuʼlláh's son and successor, proposed caps on the largest fortunes, progressive taxation, and profit-sharing between businesses and their workers, while rejecting complete equality of incomes. Baháʼí teachings also extend justice to the international order, describing a future world order with a world parliament elected by the people of each country, an international executive able to enforce its decisions, and a supreme tribunal with binding authority.

Baháʼís promote social justice through social action directed toward the establishment of world peace. Baháʼí teachings require adherents to obey the governments under which they live, and to abstain from party politics, civil disobedience, and the holding of political office. Baháʼí social action is non-sectarian, aiming to build capacity within populations rather than to deliver social services. Baháʼís have worked for racial unity, human rights, the advancement of women, and social and economic development, including at the United Nations through the Baháʼí International Community.

=== Eastern religions ===
==== Hinduism ====
The present-day Jāti hierarchy is undergoing changes for a variety of reasons including 'social justice', which is a politically popular stance in democratic India. Institutionalized affirmative action has promoted this. The disparity and wide inequalities in social behaviour of the jātis – exclusive, endogamous communities centred on traditional occupations – has led to various reform movements in Hinduism. While legally outlawed, the caste system remains strong in practice.

==== Traditional Chinese religion ====
The Chinese concept of Tian Ming has occasionally been perceived as an expression of social justice. Through it, the deposition of unfair rulers is justified in that civil dissatisfaction and economical disasters is perceived as Heaven withdrawing its favor from the Emperor. A successful rebellion is considered definite proof that the Emperor is unfit to rule.

== Social justice movements ==
Social justice is also a concept that is used to describe the movement towards a socially just world, e.g., the Global Justice Movement. In this context, social justice is based on the concepts of human rights and equality, and can be defined as "the way in which human rights are manifested in the everyday lives of people at every level of society".

Several movements are working to achieve social justice in society. These movements are working toward the realization of a world where all members of a society, regardless of background or procedural justice, have basic human rights and equal access to the benefits of their society.

=== Liberation theology ===
Liberation theology is a movement in Christian theology which conveys the teachings of Jesus Christ in terms of a liberation from unjust economic, political, or social conditions. It has been described by proponents as "an interpretation of Christian faith through the poor's suffering, their struggle and hope, and a critique of society and the Catholic faith and Christianity through the eyes of the poor", and by detractors as Christianity perverted by Marxism and Communism.

Although liberation theology has grown into an international and inter-denominational movement, it began as a movement within the Catholic Church in Latin America in the 1950s–1960s. It arose principally as a moral reaction to the poverty caused by social injustice in that region. It achieved prominence in the 1970s and 1980s. The term was coined by the Peruvian priest Gustavo Gutiérrez, who wrote one of the movement's most famous books, A Theology of Liberation (1971). According to Sarah Kleeb, "Marx would surely take issue", she writes, "with the appropriation of his works in a religious context...there is no way to reconcile Marx's views of religion with those of Gutierrez, they are simply incompatible. Despite this, in terms of their understanding of the necessity of a just and righteous world, and the nearly inevitable obstructions along such a path, the two have much in common; and, particularly in the first edition of [A Theology of Liberation], the use of Marxian theory is quite evident."

Other noted exponents are Leonardo Boff of Brazil, Carlos Mugica of Argentina, Jon Sobrino of El Salvador, and Juan Luis Segundo of Uruguay.

=== Health care ===
Social justice has more recently made its way into the field of bioethics. Discussion involves topics such as affordable access to health care, especially for low-income households and families. The discussion also raises questions such as whether society should bear healthcare costs for low-income families, and whether the global marketplace is the best way to distribute healthcare. Ruth Faden of the Johns Hopkins Berman Institute of Bioethics and Madison Powers of Georgetown University focus their analysis of social justice on which inequalities matter the most. They develop a social justice theory that answers some of these questions in concrete settings.

Social injustices occur when there is a preventable difference in health states among a population of people. These social injustices take the form of health inequities when negative health states such as malnourishment, and infectious diseases are more prevalent in impoverished nations. These negative health states can often be prevented by providing social and economic structures such as primary healthcare which ensures the general population has equal access to health care services regardless of income level, gender, education or any other stratifying factors. Integrating social justice with health inherently reflects the social determinants of health model without discounting the role of the bio-medical model.

=== Health inequalities ===
The sources of health inequalities are rooted in injustices associated with racism, sex discrimination, and social class. Richard Hofrichter and his colleagues examine the political implications of various perspectives used to explain health inequities and explore alternative strategies for eliminating them.

=== Human rights education ===
The Vienna Declaration and Programme of Action affirm that "Human rights education should include peace, democracy, development and social justice, as set forth in international and regional human rights instruments, to achieve common understanding and awareness to strengthen universal commitment to human rights."

=== Ecology and environment ===
Social justice principles are embedded in the larger environmental movement. The third principle of the Earth Charter is social and economic justice, which is described as seeking to eradicate poverty as an ethical, social, and environmental imperative, ensure that economic activities and institutions at all levels promote human development in an equitable and sustainable manner, affirm gender equality and equity as prerequisites to sustainable development and ensure universal access to education, health care, and economic opportunity, and uphold the right of all, without discrimination, to a natural and social environment supportive of human dignity, bodily health, and spiritual well-being, with special attention to the rights of indigenous peoples and minorities.

The climate justice and environmental justice movements also incorporate social justice principles, ideas, and practices. Climate justice and environmental justice, as movements within the larger ecological and environmental movement, each incorporate social justice in a particular way. Climate justice includes concern for social justice pertaining to greenhouse gas emissions, climate-induced environmental displacement, as well as climate change mitigation and adaptation. Environmental justice includes concern for social justice pertaining to either environmental benefits or environmental pollution based on their equitable distribution across communities of color, communities of various socio and economic stratification, or any other barriers to justice.

== Opposition to concept ==
Michael Novak argues that social justice has seldom been adequately defined. He wrote:

[W]hole books and treatises have been written about social justice without ever defining it. It is allowed to float in the air as if everyone will recognize an instance of it when it appears. This vagueness seems indispensable. The minute one begins to define social justice, one runs into embarrassing intellectual difficulties. It becomes, most often, a term of art whose operational meaning is, "We need a law against that." In other words, it becomes an instrument of ideological intimidation, for the purpose of gaining the power of legal coercion.

Friedrich Hayek of the Austrian School of economics rejected the very idea of social justice as meaningless, self-contradictory, and ideological, believing that to realize any degree of social justice is unfeasible, and that the attempt to do so must destroy all liberty. He wrote:

There can be no test by which we can discover what is 'socially unjust' because there is no subject by which such an injustice can be committed, and there are no rules of individual conduct the observance of which in the market order would secure to the individuals and groups the position which as such (as distinguished from the procedure by which it is determined) would appear just to us. [Social justice] does not belong to the category of error but to that of nonsense, like the term 'a moral stone'.

Hayek argued that proponents of social justice often present it as a moral virtue but most of their descriptions pertain to impersonal states of affairs (e.g. income inequality or poverty), which are cited as "social injustice". Hayek argued that social justice is either a virtue or it is not. If it is, it can only be ascribed to the actions of individuals; however, most who use the term ascribe it to social systems, so social justice in fact describes a regulative principle of order; they are interested not in virtue but power. For Hayek, this notion of social justices presupposes that people are guided by specific external directions rather than internal, personal rules of just conduct. It further presupposes that one can never be held accountable for ones own behaviour, as this would be "blaming the victim". According to Hayek, the function of social justice is to blame someone else, often attributed to "the system" or those who are supposed, mythically, to control it. Thus, it is based on the appealing idea of "you suffer; your suffering is caused by powerful others; these oppressors must be destroyed." Ben O'Neill of the University of New South Wales and the Mises Institute argues:

[For advocates of social justice] the notion of "rights" is a mere term of entitlement, indicative of a claim for any possible desirable good, no matter how important or trivial, abstract or tangible, recent or ancient. It is merely an assertion of desire, and a declaration of intention to use the language of rights to acquire said desire. In fact, since the program of social justice inevitably involves claims for government provision of goods, paid for through the efforts of others, the term actually refers to an intention to use force to acquire one's desires. Not to earn desirable goods by rational thought and action, production and voluntary exchange, but to go in there and forcibly take goods from those who can supply them!

== See also ==
- Activism – Efforts to make change in society toward a perceived greater good
- "Beyond Vietnam: A Time to Break Silence – 1967 speech delivered by Martin Luther King Jr."
- Choosing the Common Good – 2010 British Catholic document
- Climate justice – Concept for social justice in climate change context
- Critical theory – Approach to social philosophy
- Counterculture of the 1960s – Anti-establishment cultural phenomenon
- Economic justice – Subcategory of welfare economics
- Environmental racism – Environmental injustice that occurs within a racialized context
- Essentially contested concept – Problem in philosophy
- Global justice – Issue in political philosophy
- Human trafficking – Trade of humans for exploitation
- Institutional abuse – Mistreatment of a person from a system of power
- Justice (virtue) – Cardinal virtue
- Labour law – Laws that govern the relationship between workers, employers, unions and governments and labour rights
- Macro social work – Specific Approach to Social Work
- Resource justice
- Right to education – Human right
- Right to health – Human right towards individual health
- Right to housing – Economic, social and cultural right
- Right to social security – Means-oriented social benefit
- Social conscience – Sense of responsibility or concern for the problems of society
- Social criticism – Form of interpreting and sorting issues in contemporary society
- Social justice art
- Social justice warrior – Pejorative term for a socially progressive person
- Social law – Unified concept of law
- Social work – Academic discipline and profession
- Solidarity – Unity of feeling or action on a common interest
- National Union for Social Justice (organization) – American political movement (1934–1936)
- World Day of Social Justice – International observance for social justice
