= Distributive justice =

Concept relating to distribution of rewards to group members

Distributive justice concerns the socially just allocation of resources, goods and opportunities in a society. It is concerned with how to allocate resources fairly among members of a society, taking into account factors such as wealth, income, and social status. Often contrasted with just process and formal equal opportunity, distributive justice concentrates on outcomes (substantive equality). This subject has been given considerable attention in philosophy and the social sciences. Theorists have developed widely different conceptions of distributive justice. These have contributed to debates around the arrangement of social, political and economic institutions to promote the just distribution of benefits and burdens within a society. Most contemporary theories of distributive justice rest on the precondition of material scarcity. From that precondition arises the need for principles to resolve competing interest and claims concerning a just or at least morally preferable distribution of scarce resources.

In social psychology, distributive justice is defined as perceived fairness of how rewards and costs are shared by (distributed across) group members. For example, when some workers work more hours but receive the same pay, group members may feel that distributive justice has not occurred. To determine whether distributive justice has taken place, individuals often turn to the behavioral expectations of their group. If rewards and costs are allocated according to the designated distributive norms of the group, distributive justice has occurred.

== Types of distributive norms ==
Five types of distributive norm are defined by Donelson R. Forsyth:

1. Equality: Regardless of their inputs, all group members should be given an equal share of the rewards/costs. Equality supports that someone who contributes 20% of the group's resources should receive as much as someone who contributes 60%.
2. Equity: Members' outcomes should be based upon their inputs. Therefore, an individual who has invested a large amount of input (e.g. time, money, energy) should receive more from the group than someone who has contributed very little. Members of large groups prefer to base allocations of rewards and costs on equity.
3. Power: Those with more authority, status, or control over the group should receive more than those in lower level positions.
4. Need: Those in greatest needs should be provided with resources needed to meet those needs. These individuals should be given more resources than those who already possess them, regardless of their input.
5. Responsibility: Group members who have the most should share their resources with those who have less.

== Theories of distributive justice ==
The listed theories below are some of the most prominent theories within the field. With this in mind, the list is in no way to be considered exhaustive for distributive justice theory.

=== Justice as fairness ===
In his book A Theory of Justice, John Rawls outlines his famous theory about justice as fairness. The theory consists of three core components:

1. the equality of people in rights and liberties;
2. the equality of opportunities for all; and
3. an arrangement of economic inequalities focused on benefit maximisation for those who are least advantaged.

==== The just 'basic structure' ====
Building a modern view on social contract theory, Rawls bases his work on an idea of justice being rooted in the basic structure, constituting the fundamental rules in society, which shape the social and economic institutions, as well as the governance. This basic structure is what shapes the citizens' life opportunities. According to Rawls, the structure is based on principles about basic rights and duties that any self-interested, rational individual would accept in order to further his/her own interests in a context of social cooperation.

==== The original position ====
Rawls presents the concept of an original position as a hypothetical idea of how to establish "a fair procedure so that any principles agreed on will be just." In his envisioning of the original position, it is created from a judgement made through negotiations between a group of people who will decide on what a just distribution of primary goods is (according to Rawls, the primary goods include freedoms, opportunities, and control over resources). These people are assumed to be guided by self-interest, while also having a basic idea of morality and justice, and thus capable of understanding and evaluating a moral argument. Rawls then argues that procedural justice in the process of negotiation will be possible via a nullification of temptations for these people to exploit circumstances so as to favor their own position in society.

==== Veil of ignorance ====
This nullification of temptations is realised through a veil of ignorance, which these people will be behind. The veil prevents the people from knowing what particular preferences they will have by concealing their talents, objectives, and, most importantly, where in society they themselves will end up. The veil, on the other hand, does not conceal general information about the society, and the people are assumed to possess societal and economic knowledge beyond the personal level. Thereby, such veil creates an environment for negotiations where the evaluation of the distribution of goods is based on general considerations, regardless of place in society, rather than biased considerations based on personal gains for specific citizen positions. By this logic, the negotiations will be sensitive to both those who are worst off, given that a risk of being in that category yourself will incentivize protection of these people, but also the rest of society, as one would not wish to hinder maximal utilisation for these in case you would end up in higher classes.

==== Basic principles of a just distribution ====
In this original position, the main concern will be to secure the goods that are most essential for pursuing the goals of each individual, regardless of what this specific goal might be. With this in mind, Rawls theorizes two basic principles of just distribution.

The first principle, the liberty principle, is the equal access to basic rights and liberties for all. With this, each person should be able to access the most extensive set of liberties that is compatible with similar schemes of access by other citizens. Thereby, it is not only a question of positive individual access but also of negative restrictions so as to respect others' basic rights and liberties.

The second principle, the difference principle, addresses how the arrangement of social and economic inequalities, and thus the just distribution should look. Firstly, Rawls argues that such distribution should be based on a reasonable expectation of advantage for all, but also to the greatest benefit of the least advantaged in society. Secondly, the offices and positions attached to this arrangement should be open to all.

These principles of justice are then prioritised according to two additional principles:

1. the principles of the priority of liberty, wherein basic liberties only can be restricted if this is done for the sake of protecting liberty either:
  1. by strengthening "the total system of liberties shared by all;" or
  2. if a less than equal liberty is acceptable to those who are subject to this same lesser liberty.
2. inequality of opportunity, and the priority of efficiency & welfare, can only be acceptable if:
  1. it enhances "the opportunities of those with lesser opportunities" in society; and/or
  2. excessive saving either balances out or lessens the gravity of hardship for those who do not traditionally benefit.

=== Utilitarianism ===
In 1789, Jeremy Bentham published his book An Introduction to the Principles of Morals and Legislation. Centred on individual utility and welfare, utilitarianism builds on the notion that any action which increases the overall welfare in society is good, and any action that decreases welfare is bad. By this notion, utilitarianism's focus lies with its outcomes and pays little attention to how these outcomes are shaped. This idea of utilisation maximisation, while being a much broader philosophical consideration, also translates into a theory of justice.

==== Conceptualising welfare ====
While the basic notion that utilitarianism builds on seems simple, one major dispute within the school of utilitarianism revolved around the conceptualisation and measurement of welfare. With disputes over this fundamental aspect, utilitarianism is evidently a broad term embracing many different sub-theories under its umbrella, and while much of the theoretical framework transects across these conceptualisations, using the different conceptualisation have clear implications for how we understand the more practical side of utilitarianism in distributive justice.

Bentham originally conceptualised this according to the hedonistic calculus, which also became the foundation for John Stuart Mill's focus on intellectual pleasures as the most beneficial contribution to societal welfare. Another path has been painted by Aristotle, based on an attempt to create a more universal list of conditions required for human prosperity. Opposite this, another path focuses on a subjective evaluation of happiness and satisfaction in human lives.

=== Egalitarianism ===
Based on a fundamental notion of equal worth and moral status of human beings, egalitarianism is concerned with equal treatment of all citizens in both respect and in concern, and in relation to the state as well as one another. Egalitarianism focuses more on the process through which distribution takes place, egalitarianism evaluates the justification for a certain distribution based on how the society and its institutions have been shaped, rather than what the outcome is. Attention is mainly given to ways in which unchosen person circumstances affect and hinder individuals and their life opportunities. As Elizabeth Anderson defines it, "the positive aim of egalitarian justice is...to create a community in which people stand in relation of equality to others."

The main issue with egalitarian conceptions of distributive justice is the question concerning what kind of equality should be pursued. This is because one kind of equality might imply or require inequality of another kind. Strict egalitarianism, for instance, requires the equal allocation of material resources to every person of a given society. The principle of strict equality therefore holds that even if an unequal distribution would make everyone better off, or if an unequal distribution would make some better off but no one worse off, the strictly egalitarian distribution should be upheld. This notion of distributive justice can be critiqued because it can result in Pareto suboptimal distributions. Thus, the Pareto norm suggests that principles of distributive justice should result in allocations in which it is no longer possible to make anyone better off without making anyone else worse off. This illustrates a concern for the equality of welfare, which is an ex post conception of equality as it is concerned with the equality in outcomes. This conception has been critiqued by those in favour of ex ante equality, that is equality in people´s prospects, which is captured by alternative conceptions of equality such as those that demand equality of opportunity.

While much academic work distinguishes between luck egalitarianism and social egalitarianism, Roland Pierik presents a synthesis combining the two branches. In his synthesis, he argues that instead of focusing on compensations for unjust inequalities in society via redistribution of primary goods, egalitarianism scholars should instead, given the fundamental notion upon which the theory is built, strive to create institutions that creates and promotes meaningful equal opportunities from the get-go. Pierik thus moves egalitarianism's otherwise reactive nature by emphasising a need for attention to the development of fundamentally different institutions that would eradicate the need for redistribution and instead focus on the initial equal distribution of opportunities from which people then themselves be able to shape their lives.

=== Marxism ===
The slogan "From each according to his ability, to each according to his needs" refers to distributive justice in Marxism according to Karl Marx. In Marxism-Leninism according to Vladimir Lenin the slogan "He who does not work, neither shall he eat" is a necessary approach to distributive justice on the path towards a communist society.

== Application and outcomes ==
=== Outcomes ===
Recent research has introduced probabilistic models, such as the Boltzmann Fair Division, which apply statistical and thermodynamic principles to the allocation of resources in society. These models provide a flexible and unbiased approach to distributive justice, allowing parameters to be tuned for equality, merit, or need. The Boltzmann fair division framework has been shown to bridge classical theories and practical policy applications, enabling fair and efficient distributions across diverse settings.

Distributive justice also affects organizational performance when efficiency and productivity are involved. Improving perceptions of justice increases performance. Organizational citizenship behaviors (OCBs) are employee actions in support of the organization that are outside the scope of their job description. Such behaviors depend on the degree to which an organization is perceived to be distributively just. As organizational actions and decisions are perceived as more just, employees are more likely to engage in OCBs. Perceptions of distributive justice are also strongly related to the withdrawal of employees from the organization. Perceived fairness in the distribution of shared resources has also been proposed as a condition for sustained cooperation in commons institutions.

=== Wealth ===
Distributive justice considers whether the distribution of goods among the members of society at a given time is subjectively acceptable.

Not all advocates of consequentialist theories are concerned with an equitable society. What unites them is the mutual interest in achieving the best possible results or, in terms of the example above, the best possible distribution of wealth.

=== Environmental justice ===
Distributive justice in an environmental context is the equitable distribution of a society's technological and environmental risks, impacts, and benefits. These burdens include exposure to hazardous waste, land appropriation, armed violence, and murder. Distributive justice is an essential principle of environmental justice because there is evidence that shows that these burdens cause health problems, negatively affect quality of life, and drive down property value.

The potential negative social impacts of environmental degradation and regulatory policies have been at the center environmental discussions since the rise of environmental justice. Environmental burdens fall disproportionately upon the Global South, while benefits are primarily accrued to the Global North.

=== In politics ===
Distributive justice theory argues that societies have a duty to individuals in need and that all individuals have a duty to help others in need. Proponents of distributive justice link it to human rights. Many governments are known for dealing with issues of distributive justice, especially in countries with ethnic tensions and geographically distinctive minorities.

=== Catholic Church ===
Distributive justice is also fundamental to the Catholic Church's social teaching, inspiring such figures as Dorothy Day and Pope John Paul II.

== Criticism ==
=== Friedrich von Hayek ===
Within the context of Western liberal democracies in the post-WWII decades, Friedrich von Hayek was one of the most famous opposers of the idea of distributive justice. For him, social and distributive justice were meaningless and impossible to attain, on the grounds of being within a system where the outcomes are not determined deliberately by the people but contrarily spontaneity is the norm. Therefore, distributive justice, redistribution of wealth, and the demands for social justice in a society ruled by an impersonal process such as the market are in this sense incompatible with that system.

In his book The Road to Serfdom, there can be found considerations about social assistance from the state. There, in talking about the importance of a restrictive kind of security (the one against physical privation) in front of one that necessarily needs to control or abolish the market, Hayek poses that "there can be no doubt that some minimum of food, shelter, and clothing, sufficient to preserve health and the capacity to work, can be assured to everybody". Providing this type of security is for Hayek compatible with individual freedom as it does not involve planning. But already in this early work, he acknowledges the fact that this provision must keep the incentives and the external pressure going and not select which group enjoys security and which does not, for under these conditions "the striving for security tends to become higher than the love of freedom". Therefore, fostering a certain kind of security (the one that for him socialist economic policies follow) can entail growing insecurity as the privilege increases social differences. Notwithstanding, he concludes that "adequate security against severe privation, and the reduction of the avoidable causes of misdirected effort and consequent disappointment, will have to be one of the main goals of policy".

Hayek dismisses an organizational view that ascribes certain outcomes to an intentional design, which would be contrary to his proposed spontaneous order. For this, Hayek famously firstly regards the term social (or distributive) justice as meaningless when it is applied to the results of a liberal market system that should yield spontaneous outcomes. Justice has an individual component for Hayek, is only understood in the aggregation of individual actions which follow common rules, social and distributive justice are the negative opposite as they need a command economy. Secondly, following Tebble's (2009) view, the concept of social justice is for Hayek a reminiscence of an atavistic view towards society, that has been overcome by the survival capacity of the catallactic order and its values.

The third Hayekian critique is about the unfeasibility of attaining distributive justice in a free market order and this is defended on the basis of the determinate goal that all distributive justice aims to. In a catallactic order, the individual morality should freely determine what are distributive fairness and the values that govern economic activity, and the fact that it is impossible to gather all the individual information in a single pursuit for social and distributive justice results in realizing the fact that it cannot be pursued. Lastly, Hayek claims for the incompatibility between the free market and social justice, for, in essence, they are different kinds of inequalities. The former is one determined by the interaction of free individuals and the latter by the decision of an authority. Hayek will, on ethical grounds, choose the former.

=== Robert Nozick ===
One of the major exponents of the libertarian outlook toward distributive justice is Robert Nozick. In his book Anarchy, State, and Utopia he stresses how the term distributive justice is not a neutral one. In fact, there is no central distributor that can be regarded as such. What each person gets, he or she gets from the outcomes of Lockean self-ownership (a condition that implies one's labor mixed with the world), or others who give to him in exchange for something, or as a gift. For him, "there is no more a distributing or distribution of shares than there is a distribution of mates in a society in which persons choose whom they shall marry". This means that there can be no pattern to which to conform or aim. The market and the result of individual actions provided the conditions for libertarian principles of just acquisition and exchange (contained in his Entitlement Theory) will have as a result a distribution that will be just, without the need for considerations about the specific model or standard it should follow.

== See also ==
- Law
- Justice
- Distributism
- Citizen's dividend
- Consequentialism
- Constitutional economics
- Contributive justice
- Distribution (economics)
- Extended sympathy
- Environmental racism
- Injustice
- Interactional justice
- Justice (economics)
- John Rawls
- Median income
- Restorative justice
- Retributive justice
- Rule According to Higher Law
- Rule of law
- Service recovery paradox
- Social dividend
- Teaching for social justice
- Transformative justice
- Utilitarianism
- Boltzmann Fair Division
