= Harsanyi's utilitarian theorem =

Pareto efficiency implies utilitarian rule

In decision theory, the Harsanyi's utilitarian theorem proves mathematically that a rational social welfare function that satisfies the expected utility axioms and respects the Pareto indifference principle must be a weighted sum of individuals' utility functions.

== Theorem ==
=== Assumptions ===
1. The society (or group) is rational and maximizes expected social welfare.
2. Each individual in the group is rational and maximizes his individual's expected utility.
3. If every individual in the group is indifferent between two probability distributions, then the group as a whole is indifferent as well.

=== Statement ===
John Harsanyi, through this theorem, proves that a social welfare function that satisfies these three assumptions, would be the weighted sum of expected individual utility functions.

Mathematically, the social welfare function $W$ can be represented as a linear combination of individual utilities:
$$W(x)=\sum_{i=1}^{n} a_i u_i(x) + c$$

where:

- $u_i(x)$ is the von Neumann–Morgenstern (vNM) utility function of individual $i$.
- $a_i$ is the weight assigned to individual $i$, reflecting the individual's contribution to social welfare.
- $c$ is a normalization constant, that does not affect the ordering of social preferences.

== See also ==
- Utilitarian rule
- Von Neumann–Morgenstern utility theorem
- Utility maximization problem
