= Resource justice =

Resource justice (also referred to as "resource equity" or "resource governance") is a term in environmentalism and in environmental ethics. It combines elements of distributive justice and environmental justice and is based on the observation that many countries rich in natural resources such as minerals and other raw materials nevertheless experience high levels of poverty (resource curse).

== Factors leading to resource injustice ==
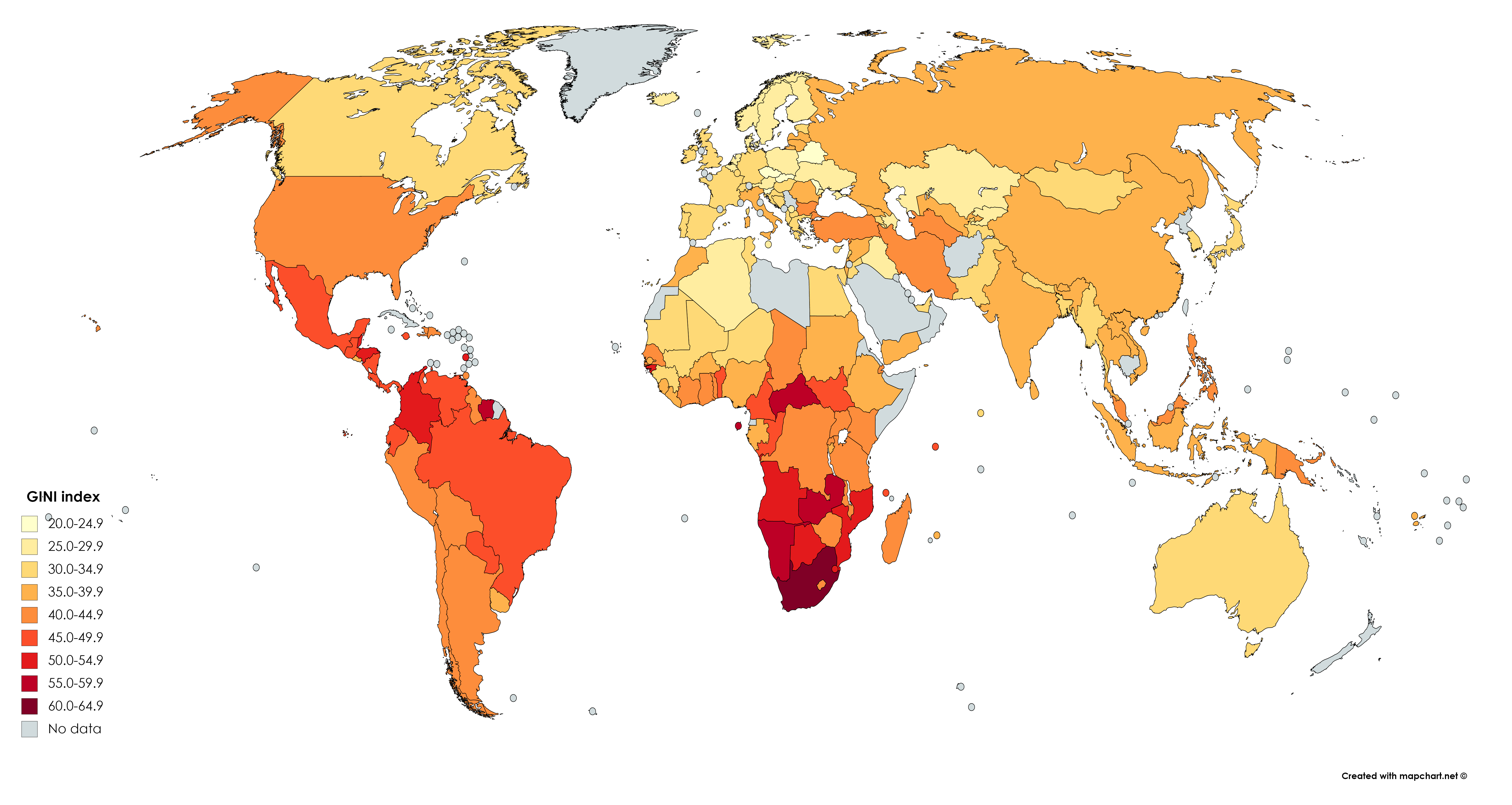
Countries' income inequality according to their Gini coefficient as of 2018.

The term resource justice as a subcategory of distributive justice was first developed following the repeated observation that natural resources that, supposedly, are a blessing for local populations, turn out to be a curse. This can manifest itself in a number of ways – and for a number of reasons, some of which occur in isolation but more often arise together. Some examples are:

- Mining or oil drilling result in severe damage to the environment, for example through oil spills, environmental degradation, or contamination.
- The extraction of resources leads to extreme forms of exploitation of labour and / or creates very hazardous working conditions.
- Resources are being controlled by a small elite that makes or embezzles all the profits. This often goes along with corruption.
- People are forced off their land to make place for resource extraction or for large monocultural plantations.
- Resources in the developing world are being extracted by companies from industrialised countries, with most of the profits going to the latter.
- Companies extract genetic material, which is then commercially farmed or bred – and often patented.

== Approaches towards greater resource justice ==
Capacity building and external support in order to empower "communities affected by oil, gas, and mining operations" so that they themselves are able to determine how local resources are being used. In addition, mechanisms have to be developed to make sure that finite resources are distributed in an equitable way so that poor nations' right to development is not denied. The memorandum Resource Politics for a Fair Future, published by the Heinrich Böll Foundation lists three criteria for a "fair and sustainable Resource Politics", namely:

- to "secure the rights of people and nature over markets and profits" and empower them to demand their rights;
- to return the "control over natural resources, financial capital and technologies (...) into the hands of the people;
- to "transform production, consumption and livelihoods" in ways that enable people to live in a world of global equity.

== See also ==
- Climate justice
- Distributive justice
- Environmental ethics
- Environmental racism
