= Compensation principle =

Law in welfare economics centered around prospective gainers helping losers

In welfare economics, the compensation principle refers to a decision rule used to select between pairs of alternative feasible social states. One of these states is the hypothetical point of departure ("the original state"). According to the compensation principle, if the prospective gainers could compensate (any) prospective losers and leave no one worse off, the alternate state is to be selected. An example of a compensation principle is the Pareto criterion in which a change in states entails that such compensation is not merely feasible but required. Two variants are:

- the Pareto principle, which requires any change such that all gain.
- the (strong) Pareto criterion, which requires any change such that at least one gains and no one loses from the change.

In non-hypothetical contexts such that the compensation occurs (say in the marketplace), invoking the compensation principle is unnecessary to effect the change. But its use is more controversial and complex with some losers (where full compensation is feasible but not made) and in selecting among more than two feasible social states. In its specifics, it is also more controversial where the range of the decision rule itself is at issue.

Uses for the compensation principle include:

- comparisons between the welfare properties of perfect competition and imperfect competition
- the Pareto principle in social choice theory
- cost–benefit analysis.

== See also ==
- Compensating variation – Economic measure of utility change
- Cost–benefit analysis – Systematic approach to estimating the strengths and weaknesses of alternatives
- Kaldor–Hicks efficiency – State leading to a Pareto-efficient outcome, concerning the compensation principle
- Pareto efficiency – Weakly optimal allocation of resources
- Social choice theory – Study of rational collective decision-making
- Welfare economics – Use of microeconomic techniques to evaluate well-being at the aggregate level
- Theory of the second best – Branch of economics studying next-best alternatives

== Literature ==
- John S. Chipman (2008). "compensation principle". The New Palgrave: A Dictionary of Economics (2nd ed.). doi:10.1057/978-1-349-95121-5.
- Kenneth J. Arrow (1963). "IV". Social Choice and Individual Values.
- Louis Kaplow (2008). "Pareto principle and competing principles". The New Palgrave Dictionary of Economics (2nd ed.). doi:10.1057/978-1-349-95121-5.
- Dehez, P.; Tellone, D. (2013). "Data games: Sharing public goods with exclusion" (PDF). Journal of Public Economic Theory. 15 (4): 654–673.
