= Ranked voting =

Voting systems that use ranked ballots

Ovals

Names

Numbers

Various types of ranked voting ballot

Ranked voting is any voting system that uses voters' rankings of candidates to choose a single winner or multiple winners. More formally, a ranked vote system depends only on voters' order of preference of the candidates.

Ranked voting systems vary widely in how preferences are tabulated and counted. This gives them different properties with respect to satisfying various voting groups and adherence to mathematical rules.

In instant-runoff voting (IRV) and the single transferable vote system (STV), lower preferences are used as contingencies and are only applied when all candidates marked as higher-ranked preferences on a ballot have been eliminated or when the vote has been cast for a candidate who has been elected and surplus votes need to be transferred. Ranked votes of this type do not suffer the problem that a marked lower preference may be used against a voter's higher marked preference.

Some ranked vote systems do not use ranking to transfer votes but instead use ranks as weights. These systems are called positional voting. In the Borda method, the least-favored candidates on each ballot receive fewer points; the most-favored receive more points. The points on each ballot for each candidate are added together, and the candidate with the most points is elected.

In the United States and Australia, the terms ranked-choice voting and preferential voting, respectively, almost always refer to instant-runoff voting; however, because these terms have also been used to mean ranked systems in general, many social choice theorists recommend the use of the term instant-runoff voting in contexts where confusion might arise.

Ranked votes do not incorporate any information about intensity of preferences. Furthermore, common implementations do not account for equality of preference among two or more candidates.

Ranked voting systems that use ordinal numbers (1, 2, 3, etc.) such as IRV, STV and the Borda method are contrasted with rated voting methods, which allow voters to indicate how strongly they support candidates (e.g. on a scale from 0 to 10). Ranked vote systems using ordinal numbers produce more information than X voting systems such as first-past-the-post voting. Rated voting systems produce more information than systems that use ordinal ballots; as a result, some common results, like Arrow's theorem, do not directly apply to them.

Some ranked voting systems require the voter rank a set number of candidates. Those that use optional preferential voting allow the voter full liberty as to how many candidates they rank. Under STV or IRV, not all rankings are used in any case.

== History of ranked voting theory and its adoption ==
Plurality voting is the most common voting system and has been in widespread use since the earliest democracies. As plurality voting has exhibited weaknesses from its start, especially as soon as a third party joins the race, some social scientists began to recommend transferable votes (facilitated by contingent ranked ballots) to reduce the incidence of wasted votes and unrepresentative election results.

== Equal-ranked ballots ==
In voting with a ranked ballot, a tied or equal-rank ballot is one where two or more candidates receive the same rank or rating. In instant runoff and first-past-the-post, such ballots are generally rejected as the intent of the voter is unclear. However, in social choice theory, some election systems assume equal-ranked ballots are "split" evenly between the equal-ranked candidates (e.g. in a two-way tie, each candidate receives half a vote). The Borda count and the Condorcet method can handle equal-rank ballots differently than simply splitting a vote. Different rules produce different mathematical properties and behaviors, particularly under strategic voting.

== Truncated ballots ==
When a voter does not rank all the candidates, the ballot is called truncated or partial. In IRV and STV, a truncated ballot may become exhausted once all candidates it ranks have been eliminated. Voters may be forced to truncate in a jurisdiction that limits the number of allowed rankings or may truncate voluntarily because they lack information about lesser‑known candidates or are indifferent toward them. Truncation can also be used deliberately as a strategy, with the most extreme case being bullet voting. This can give rise to a Burr dilemma in which a voter helps a less‑preferred candidate by withholding later preferences.

== Theoretical foundations of ranked voting ==
=== Majority-rule ===
Concepts formulated by the Marquis de Condorcet in the 18th century continue to be important in the study of elections. One of these concepts is the Condorcet winner, a candidate who would win against any other candidate in a two-way race. A voting system that always elects this candidate is called a Condorcet method; however, it is possible for an election to have no Condorcet winner, a situation called a Condorcet cycle. Suppose an election with 3 candidates A, B, and C has 3 voters. One votes A > C > B, one votes B > A > C, and one votes C > B > A. In this case, no Condorcet winner exists: A cannot be a Condorcet winner as two-thirds of voters prefer B over A. Similarly, B cannot be the winner as two-thirds prefer C over B, and C cannot win as two-thirds prefer A over C. This forms a rock-paper-scissors style cycle with no Condorcet winner.

=== Social well-being ===
Voting systems can also be judged on their ability to deliver results that maximize the overall well-being of society, i.e. to choose the best candidate for society as a whole.

=== Spatial voting models ===
Spatial voting models, initially proposed by Duncan Black and further developed by Anthony Downs, provide a theoretical framework for understanding electoral behavior. In these models, each voter and candidate is positioned within an ideological space that can span multiple dimensions. It is assumed that voters tend to favor candidates who closely align with their ideological position over those more distant. A political spectrum is an example of a one-dimensional spatial model.

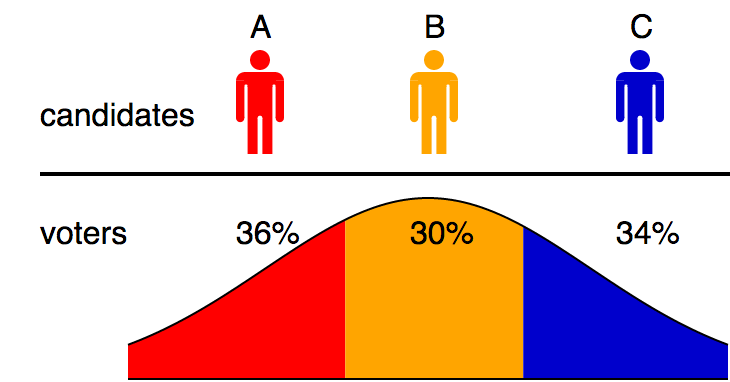
A spatial model of voting

The accompanying diagram presents a simple one-dimensional spatial model, illustrating the voting methods discussed in subsequent sections of this article. It is assumed that supporters of candidate A cast their votes in the order of A > B > C, while candidate C's supporters vote in the sequence of C > B > A. Supporters of candidate B are equally divided between listing A or C as their second preference. From the data in the accompanying table, if there are 100 voters, the distribution of ballots will reflect the positioning of voters and candidates along the ideological spectrum.

Spatial models offer significant insights because they provide an intuitive visualization of voter preferences. These models give rise to an influential theorem—the median voter theorem—attributed to Duncan Black. This theorem stipulates that within a broad range of spatial models, including all one-dimensional models and all symmetric models across multiple dimensions, a Condorcet winner is guaranteed to exist. Moreover, this winner is the candidate closest to the median of the voter distribution. Empirical research has generally found that spatial voting models give a highly accurate explanation of most voting behavior.

=== Other theorems ===
Arrow's impossibility theorem is a generalization of Condorcet's result on the impossibility of majority rule. It demonstrates that every ranked voting algorithm is susceptible to the spoiler effect. Gibbard's theorem provides a closely related corollary, that no voting rule can have a single, always-best strategy that does not depend on other voters' ballots.

== Examples ==
=== Borda count ===
The Borda count is a weighted-rank system that assigns scores to each candidate based on their position in each ballot. If m is the total number of candidates, the candidate ranked first on a ballot receives m − 1 points, the second receives m − 2, and so on, until the last-ranked candidate who receives zero. In the given example, candidate B emerges as the winner with 130 out of a total 300 points. While the Borda count is simple to administer, it does not meet the Condorcet criterion. Also, it is heavily affected by the entry of candidates who have no real chance of winning.

==== Other positional systems ====
Systems that award points in a similar way but possibly with a different formula are called positional systems. The score vector (m − 1, m − 2, ..., 0) is associated with the Borda count, (1, 1/2, 1/3, ..., 1/m) defines the Dowdall system and (1, 0, ..., 0) equates to first-past-the-post.

=== Instant-runoff voting ===
Instant-runoff voting, often conflated with ranked-choice voting in general, is a contingent ranked-vote voting method that recursively eliminates the successive plurality loser during rounds of counting and transfers their votes, if possible, until one candidate has the majority of the votes. In the given example, candidate A is declared winner in the third round, having received a majority of votes through the accumulation of first-choice votes and redistributed votes from candidate B. This system embodies the voters' preferences between the final candidates, stopping when a candidate garners the preference of a majority of voters. Instant-runoff voting does not fulfill the Condorcet winner criterion.

=== Single transferable voting ===
Single transferable voting is a contingent ranked-vote election method that elects multiple members. It elects any candidates who achieve quota, and if necessary recursively eliminates the plurality loser at various stages of the vote count. It transfers the votes of eliminated candidates and surplus votes of winners until enough are elected by quota or by still being in the running when the field of candidates is thinned to the number of remaining open seats. Because elected members are elected with the same or about the same number of votes, each party popular enough for representation receives a number of seats appropriate to the vote tallies of its candidates. The transfers reduce waste to about one quota – which in a five-seat district is about 17 percent of valid votes; in districts with more members than five, the waste is smaller. All but one quota of votes approximately are used to actually elect someone in the district so the percentage of effective votes is dependably about 80 to 90 percent of valid votes in the district.

=== Defeat-dropping Condorcet ===
The defeat-dropping Condorcet methods all look for a Condorcet winner; i.e. a candidate who is not defeated by any other candidate in a one-on-one majority vote. If there is no Condorcet winner, they repeatedly drop (set the margin to zero) for the one-on-one matchups that are closest to being tied, until there is a Condorcet winner. How "closest to being tied" is defined depends on the specific rule. For the minimax Condorcet method, the elections with the smallest margin of victory are dropped, whereas in ranked pairs, only elections that create a cycle are eligible to be dropped (with defeats being dropped based on the margin of victory).

== See also ==
- Approval voting – Single-winner electoral system
- Comparison of voting rules
- Duverger's law – Plurality voting in single-member districts tends to favor two-party competition
- Group voting ticket – Preference lists submitted by political parties
- Matrix vote – Voting procedure
- Preferential block voting
- Rank aggregation – the input is a list of rankings (as in ranked voting), but the desired output is a complete ranking of the alternatives, rather than a single winner
- Voting methods in deliberative assemblies
