= Political argument =

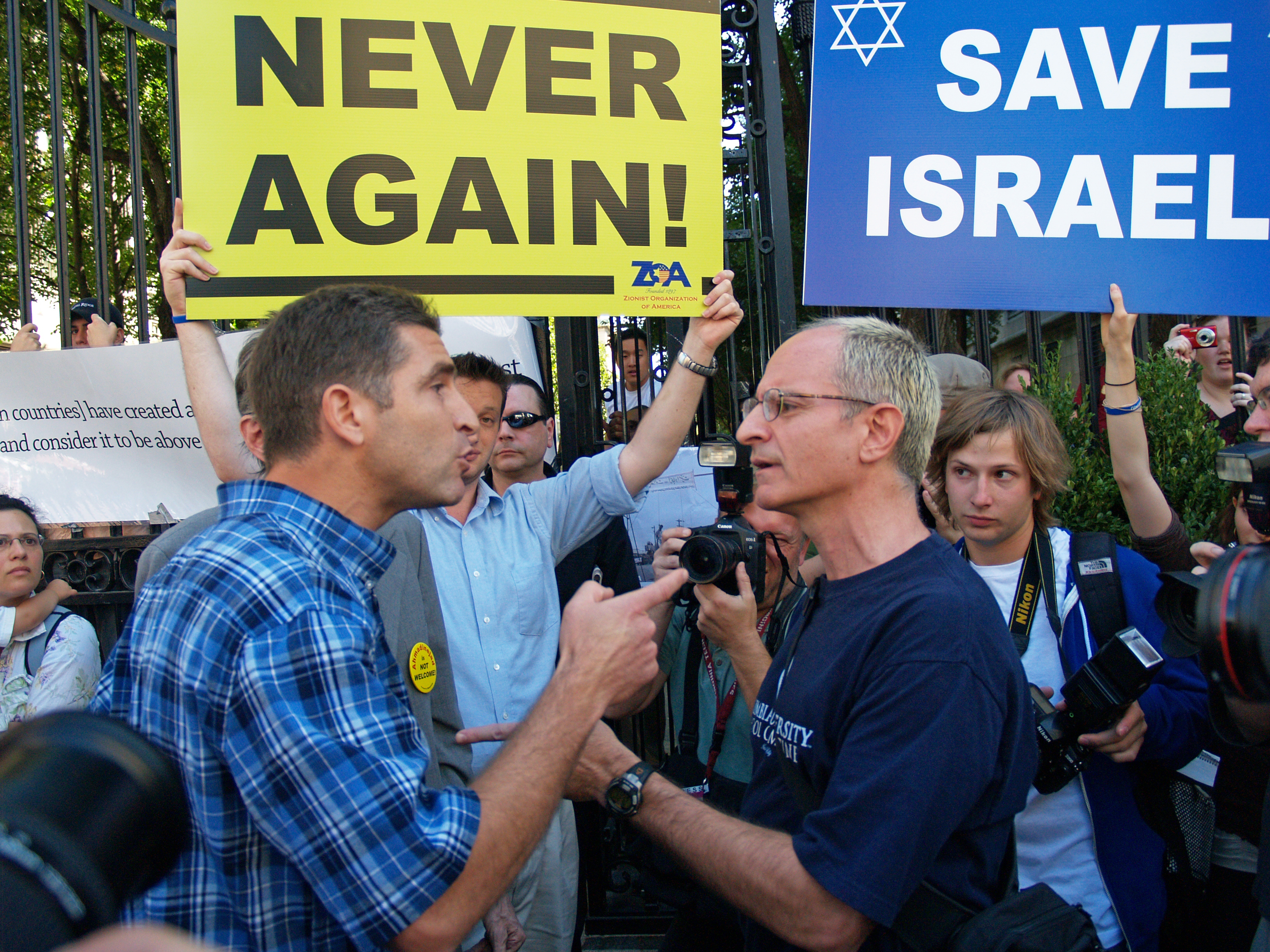
Two men arguing politics outside Iranian President Mahmoud Ahmadinejad's speech at Columbia University in 2007.

A political argument is an instance of a logical argument applied to politics. Political arguments are used by academics, media pundits, candidates for political office, and government officials. Political arguments are also used by citizens in ordinary interactions to comment on and understand political events. More often than not, political arguments tend to be circular, repeating the same facts as premises under perhaps slightly different guises. Much political argument concerns issues of taxation and government spending.

The political argument should be distinguished from propaganda, in that propaganda has little or no structure or the rationale, if it exists, is egregiously fallacious.

A classic example of political arguments is those contained in The Federalist Papers arguing in favor of ratification of the American constitution.

There are several ways of classifying political argument:

- Based on the logical structure of the argument.
- Based on the purpose of the argument.
- Based on the subject matter dealt with in the argument.

== Purpose of political argument ==
The purpose of an argument is usually to sway belief. A political argument can occur in the context of political theory; for instance Machiavelli's The Prince can be regarded as advice to rulers based on various kinds of arguments. Political argument though is not generally a purely intellectual activity, since it may also serve the strategic goal of promoting a political agenda. One usually thinks of political argument as exclusive to democracies, but in fact, some kinds of political argument may occur in undemocratic regimes as well, for example, to encourage greater sacrifice from the population, although it is more likely in such cases that propaganda will take the place of argument. In a democracy, though, political argument is particularly important, since there is a direct relationship between the beliefs of citizens and the structure of power. Moreover, the institutions of democracy in part define the relationships between beliefs and power. In this case, political argument is an important element of political strategy. It is also possible that in a democracy, propaganda may also replace argument; indeed, much political advertisement has no discernible logical structure, and in our definition falls under propaganda.

This view of political argument in a democracy is closely related to the problem of social choice. Consider a social decision model of the kind used in the theory of social choice (such as used in stating Arrow's theorem). In this model society has a set of individuals X and it faces a set of (political) alternatives A which need to be ranked in some way. A ranking is a relation R between the elements of A which is transitive and reflexive. Two alternatives a, b can satisfy a R b and b R a. If this is the case, we say R is indifferent to a, b. Each individual x in X will have an idiosyncratic ranking R_{x} of the alternatives in A. A profile is any function P that associates with each individual x a ranking of alternatives P_{x}; a profile is thus a function from X to rankings of A. An arbitration scheme (or constitution or voting scheme) is a way of producing a ranking R_{soc} for the whole society from any profile P. Thus an arbitration scheme is itself a function P → R_{soc}.

Though any argument about politics is in a sense a political argument, an effective political argument is one that can actually change the social preference ranking. An effective political argument is a concept distinct from a valid political argument.

=== Example ===
Consider an idealized system of tax policy; tax is based on a tax cutoff point T, that is individuals with income in excess of T pay taxes, and everyone else pays no taxes. In a simple majority rule social arbitration scheme, one might expect that a natural tax rate T can be determined: the median income (plus 1). However, a (possibly fallacious) political argument might attempt to change an individual's voting by their pocketbook by arguing that investment in capital and general welfare will increase by reducing taxes on higher income levels, which is raising the tax cutoff point.

A political argument may be ineffective but may still have a purpose, for instance as a justification for an unpopular political action, or as part of a historical narrative.

== Structure of political argument ==
Any argument claims to prove something. In the case of arguments used in politics, this something is an assertion about an element of the public sphere, such as economic policy, the environment, decisions about war and peace, abortion, etc. An argument cannot start from purely logical principles. An argument is based on premises and some methods for reasoning from premises to conclusions. The validity of an argument in politics can be evaluated in at least two ways: in purely semantic terms or in terms of adherence to certain rules of argument (which we can consider rules of fairness).

Semantically, some of the premises used in an argument and the relationships between the assertions in the argument are associated with specific models of economic or political processes. Other premises are moral assumptions: whether a particular action is good or desirable. For example, arguments concerning war must consider questions about specific threats that the adversary poses, the likelihood of success, the cost of war, and so on. In practice, purely semantical evaluations of argument validity are extremely difficult to formulate in a politically neutral way, since political positions usually involve a commitment to some model of social and economic processes.
