= Serge-Christophe Kolm =

French economist

- Born: December 1932 (age 93); Paris, France

Academic background
- Education: Ecole Polytechnique

Academic work
- Discipline: Public Economics and Normative Economics

Serge-Christophe Kolm (born December 1932) is a French economist. His work in economics and related social science includes his analyses, concepts and results in Public Economics and Normative Economics (hence also social ethics and political philosophy) focusing on equality, distributive justice, and efficiency of economic measures, and in other fields and problems often applying them.

== Biography ==
Born in Paris in December 1932, Serge Kolm studied at the Ecole Polytechnique where his rank permitted him to join the civil service body of the Corps des Ponts et Chaussées (which has a long tradition of applied and theoretical economic research). He worked in Africa, heading water and river basin management in the Sahel region and setting up development plans for the new independent post-colonial states. He held teaching and research positions in France (Ecole des Hautes Etudes en Sciences Sociales, Ecole Nationale de la Statistique et de l'Administration Economique, Ecole Nationale des Ponts et Chaussées, Institut d'Etudes Politiques, General Planning Commission) and in the USA (Harvard University and Stanford University), and advisory and planning functions in Europe, in various countries in transition, and for international organizations (OECD, IMF, WHO). He founded and headed a school for development economics and a research center on socio-economic analysis. Author of over 40 books and several hundred scientific articles, member of the editorial board of various scholarly journals in economics and philosophy, fellow of the Econometric Society since 1972 and of the Institute of Public Economics, Serge Kolm received honoris causa doctorates from the universities of Fribourg and Soka, and the distinction of Officier des Palmes Académiques from the French Government.

== Work ==
=== Public economics ===
Kolm's work in Public Economics includes:

- The Theory of Value Constraints: second-best optimum with constraints involving prices such as financial result, budget structure, price relations, etc. For each such constraint or set of such constraints, there is a focal point towards which the vector of outputs and inputs moves when the vector of marginal costs and productivities moves towards the price vector. Applications are to optimum taxation, duties, subsidies, management, public firms, tariffs and balance of payments, planning.
- The Theory of Public Goods: types and theory of mixed goods, "Kolm triangles", voluntary contributions, mixed public and private financing, crowd out, reasons for and types and effects of "warm-glows", cases of large numbers, types of tacit cooperation (social contracts, matching or lateral reciprocity, Kantian solutions), application to the alleviation of poverty and to environmental management.
- Optimum non-linear public tariffs and income taxation.
- The Theory of Mass Services: utilities with externalities between users (e.g. congestion).Optimum prices, investment and management. Financial result. The theory of "qualitative returns to scale". Applications to transportation, energy, environment, queuing.
- Ecological economics applying the above results plus specific values to environmental issues and policies.

=== Normative economics ===
Kolm's works in Normative Economics include:

- The Comparison and Measure of Inequalities: of income (one good), intensive, addition-neutral, intermediate, synthetic, transfers, Schur-convexity, concentrations, truncations, etc., multidimensional, of freedom of choice.
- The reasons for and types of equality.
- "Equity-no-envy" as no one preferring any other's allocation to her own, identical to equal potential freedom of choice, consistent with efficiency. Applications. The dual "adequacy"; relation. Actual envy and the definition of envy-free preferences and their properties. Other related principles.
- Super-equity. Efficient multi-dimensional equality. Cases of equal partial or total incomes.
- Comparable "fundamental" utility or preferences. Eudemonistic justice as equality, "practical justice" as leximin. Minimax in suffering.
- The definition of welfare as utility or preferences cleaned for individual differences in tastes and hedonic capacities. Computation. Consequences and applications.
- Social liberty, "liberal social contracts" and freedom-based public economics. Analysis of social liberty, a liberty fundamental to the laws and individual rights of the modern world, and its implications. Indications of the general liberal theory, including the Liberal Social Contract, in contrast to the classical liberal theory regarding the role of the public sector.
- Macrojustice: redistribution taxation respecting efficiency, basic liberties and equal freedom of choice in "Equal-Labour Income Equalization". Application by tax exemption of overtime labour.
- The Justice and Equity: Compatibility and relations of equity, efficiency, and preferences.

=== Reciprocity and giving ===
Kolm's works on pro-social conducts include the analyses of:

- Reciprocity as favouring one's benefactor, generalized to "extended", "reverse" and "general" reciprocity, including "balance" and "liking" reciprocity, applied in particular to explain spontaneous corrections of a number of "market failures".
- In his book The Good Economy, the possibility of a society structured by general reciprocity where everyone gives to society, and, reciprocally, receives from all the others. This is in opposition to exchange (in particular commercial) and transfers imposed by an external social entity.
- Joint giving as contributions to a particular public good.

=== Transitions ===
Kolm's studies and theory of transitions between various kinds of economic systems include the various types of development, and transitions from or to various kinds of socialisms.

=== Financial and monetary choices and macroeconomic policy ===
Kolm's works on financial and monetary choices and macroeconomic policy include:

- The theory of stochastic dominance and related comparisons and measures of risk (see above "Inequalities").
- The concept and theory of external liquidity: an agent's cash balances also benefit potential sellers to it and influences other agents; resulting optimum monetary policy.
- Explanation of inflation from uncertainty and from the allocation of pricing efforts.
- The shifting unemployment-inflation political cycle and spiral and crises forecast, with international synchronization.
- Optimum external monetary policy. Paths to monetary union and integration.
- Are Elections Democracy?

=== Economic psychology ===
Kolm's works on economic psychology and economic philosophical psychology include:

- The economic theory of social sentiments. Applications to altruism and to envy.
- Analysis and development of oriental philosophical psychology and applications to the modern world.

=== Contributed volumes on Kolm's works ===
The work of Serge Kolm has been the object of a number of conferences and of two volumes of contributions:

- Social Ethics and Normative Economics, Essays in honour of Serge-Christophe Kolm, edited by M. Fleurbaey, M. Salles and J. Weymark, Springer, 2011.
- On Kolm’s Theory of Macrojustice, edited by C. Gamel and M. Lubrano, Springer, 2010.
