= Abram Bergson =

American economist

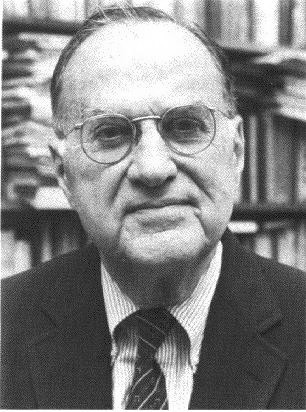
Abram Bergson

Abram Bergson (born Abram Burk, April 21, 1914, in Baltimore, Maryland – April 23, 2003, in Cambridge, Massachusetts) was an American economist, academician, and professor in the Harvard Economics Department since 1956.

== Early life and education ==
He graduated with an A.B. degree from Johns Hopkins University in 1933 and his A.M. and Ph.D. from Harvard University in 1935 and 1940, respectively.

== Career ==
In a 1938 paper Bergson defined and discussed the notion of an individualistic social welfare function. The paper delineated necessary marginal conditions for economic efficiency, relative to:

- real-valued ordinal utility functions of individuals (illustrated by indifference-curve maps) for commodities
- labor supplied
- other resource constraints.

In so doing, it showed how welfare economics could dispense with interpersonally-comparable cardinal utility (say measured by money income), either individually or in the aggregate, with no loss of behavioral significance.

Bergson was chief of the Russian Economic subdivision of the Office of Strategic Services during World War II. After the war he taught at Columbia University and Harvard University. He was elected a Fellow of the American Academy of Arts and Sciences in 1963. From 1964, he was director of the Harvard Russian Research Center and became chairman of the Social Sciences Advisory Board of the U.S. Arms Control and Disarmament Agency. He was elected to the American Philosophical Society in 1965.

His main contribution to the study of the Soviet Union was the development and implementation of a method for the calculation of national output and economic growth in the absence of market valuation. The calculation is based on factor price. In 1960 Bergson (wrongly) predicted that the USSR would overtake the US economically by the 1980s. He was elected to the United States National Academy of Sciences in 1980.

== Literary works ==
- 1938. "A Reformulation of Certain Aspects of Welfare Economics," 1938. Quarterly Journal of Economics, 52(2), pp. 310-334.
- 1954. "On the Concept of Social Welfare," Quarterly Journal of Economics, 68(2), pp. 233–252.
- Structure of Soviet Wages, 1944
- Soviet National Income and Product in 1937, 1950
- Essays in Normative Economics, 1966
