= Extended sympathy =

Extended sympathy in welfare economics refers to interpersonal value judgments of the form that social state x for person A is ranked better than, worse than, or as good as social state y for person B (Arrow, 1963, pp. 114–15). (For example: it would, perhaps, be preferable to lower a wealthy person's income in order to increase a poorer person's income by the same amount.) Here any characteristics that define each person (skills, aptitudes, etc.) are distinguished from the rest of the social state and put on a par with conventional measures of wealth insofar as they affect an extended sympathy judgment.

In his seminal work on social choice theory, Kenneth Arrow (1963) mentions the ancient lineage of extended sympathy in ethical writings and its basic, if informal, character in many welfare judgments. Arrow's book itself (p. 9) uses individual preference orderings rather than real-valued measures of preferences. This excludes interpersonal comparisons of welfare in a precise sense (invariance of social choices to linear cardinalizations of individual preference orderings). Extended-sympathy interpersonal comparisons of welfare relax that constraint (Arrow, 1983, pp. 151–2). Such comparisons expand the informational base of welfare-theoretical decisions, as Amartya Sen (1982) has emphasized. Still, variants of Arrow's dictatorial result persist in reformulation (Suzumura, 1997, p. 221).
