= Allocative efficiency =

When production relates to consumer preferences in an economy

Allocative efficiency is a state of the economy in which production is aligned with the preferences of consumers and producers; in particular, the set of outputs is chosen so as to maximize the social welfare of society. This is achieved if every produced good or service has a marginal benefit equal to or greater than the marginal cost of production.

== Description ==
In economics, allocative efficiency entails production at the point on the production possibilities frontier that is optimal for society.

In contract theory, allocative efficiency is achieved in a contract in which the skill demanded by the offering party and the skill of the agreeing party are the same.

Resource allocation efficiency includes two aspects:

1. At the macro aspect, it is the allocation efficiency of social resources, which is achieved through the economic system arrangements of the entire society.
2. The micro aspect is the efficient use of resources, which can be understood as the production efficiency of the organization, which can be improved through innovation and progress within the organizations.

Although there are different standards of evaluation for the concept of allocative efficiency, the basic principle asserts that in any economic system, choices in resource allocation produce both "winners" and "losers" relative to the choice being evaluated. The principles of rational choice, individual maximization, utilitarianism and market theory further suppose that the outcomes for winners and losers can be identified, compared, and measured. Under these basic premises, the goal of attaining allocative efficiency can be defined according to some principles where some allocations are subjectively better than others. For example, an economist might say that a policy change is an allocative improvement as long as those who benefit from the change (winners) gain more than the losers lose (see Kaldor–Hicks efficiency).

An allocatively efficient economy produces an "optimal mix" of commodities. A firm is allocatively efficient when its price is equal to its marginal costs (that is, P = MC) in a perfect market. The demand curve coincides with the marginal utility curve, which measures the (private) benefit of the additional unit, while the supply curve coincides with the marginal cost curve, which measures the (private) cost of the additional unit. In a perfect market, there are no externalities, implying that the demand curve is also equal to the social benefit of the additional unit, while the supply curve measures the social cost of the additional unit. Therefore, the market equilibrium, where demand meets supply, is also where the marginal social benefit equals the marginal social costs. At this point, the net social benefit is maximized, meaning this is the allocative efficient outcome. When a market fails to allocate resources efficiently, there is said to be market failure. Market failure may occur because of imperfect knowledge, differentiated goods, concentrated market power (e.g., monopoly or oligopoly), or externalities.

In the single-price model, at the point of allocative efficiency price is equal to marginal cost. At this point the social surplus is maximized with no deadweight loss (the latter being the value society puts on that level of output produced minus the value of resources used to achieve that level). Allocative efficiency is the main tool of welfare analysis to measure the impact of markets and public policy upon society and subgroups being made better or worse off.

It is possible to have Pareto efficiency without allocative efficiency: in such a situation, it is impossible to reallocate resources in such a way that someone gains and no one loses (hence we have Pareto efficiency), yet it would be possible to reallocate in such a way that gainers gain more than losers lose (hence with such a reallocation, we do not have allocative efficiency).

Also, for an extensive discussion of various types of allocative efficiency in a production context and their estimations see Sickles and Zelenyuk (2019, Chapter 3, etc). In view of the Pareto efficiency measurement method, it is difficult to use in actual operation, including the use of human and material resources, which is hard to achieve a full range of efficiency allocation, and it is mainly to make judgments from the allocation of funds; therefore, analyzing the funds in the stock market. Allocation efficiency is used to determine the efficiency of resource allocation in the capital market.

In a perfectly competitive market, capital market resources should be allocated among capital markets under the principle of the highest marginal benefit. Therefore, the most important measurement standard in the capital market is to observe whether capital flows into the enterprise with the best operating efficiency. The most efficient companies should also get a large amount of capital investment, and the less efficient companies should get less capital investment. There are three conditions that come with Pareto efficiency

Best trade outcome
Even if you trade again, individuals cannot get greater benefits from it. At this time, for any two consumers, the marginal substitution rate of any two commodities is the same, and the utility of the two consumers is maximized at the same time.
Optimal production
This economy must be on the boundary of its own production possibilities. At this time, for any two producers who produce different products, the marginal technology substitution rate of the two production factors that need to be input is the same, and the output of the two consumers is maximized at the same time.
Optimal product mix
The combination of products produced by the economy must reflect consumer preferences. At this time, the marginal rate of substitution between any two commodities must be the same as the marginal product conversion rate of any producer between these two commodities.

== Examples ==
=== A numerical example of allocative efficiency ===
Allocation efficiency occurs when there is an optimal distribution of goods and services, considering consumer's preference. When the price equals marginal cost of production, the allocation efficiency is at the output level. This is because the optimal distribution is achieved when the marginal utility of good equals the marginal cost. The price that consumer is willing to pay is same as the marginal utility of the consumer.

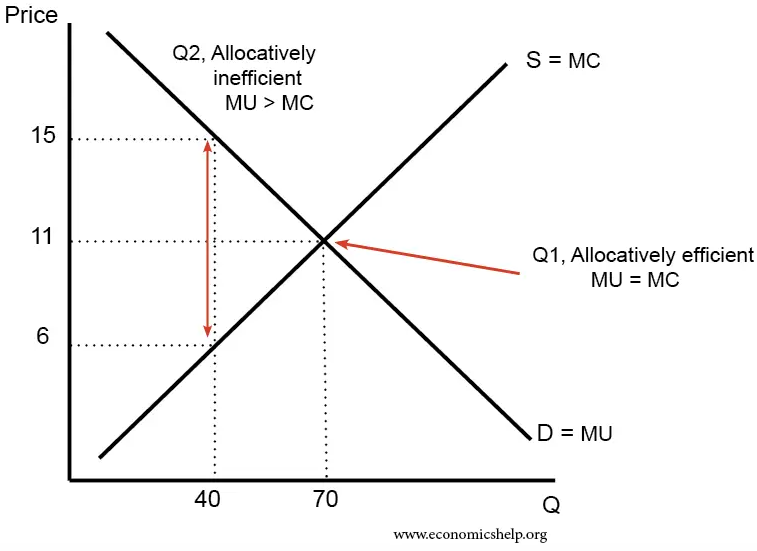
Allocative Efficiency example

From the graph we can see that at the output of 40, the marginal cost of good is $6 while the price that consumer is willing to pay is $15. It means the marginal utility of the consumer is higher than the marginal cost. The optimal level of the output is 70, where the marginal cost equals to marginal utility. At the output of 40, this product or service is under-consumed by the society. By increasing the output to 70, the price will fall to $11. Meanwhile, the society would benefit from consuming more of the good or service.

=== An example of allocation inefficiency ===
With the market power, the monopoly can increase the price to gain the super normal profit. The monopolies can set the price above the marginal cost of the production. In this case, the allocation is not efficient. It results in the dead weight welfare loss to the society as a whole. In real life, the government's intervention policy to monopoly enterprises will affect the allocation efficiency. Large-scale downstream companies with more efficient or better products are generally more competitive than other companies. The wholesale prices they get are much lower than those of their competitors. It is conducive to improving the efficiency of allocation. Ind erst and Shaffer (2009) found that banning prices would reduce allocation efficiency and lead to higher wholesale prices for all enterprises. More importantly, social welfare, industry profits, and consumer surplus will all be reduced.

== See also ==
- Financial market efficiency
- Pareto efficiency
- Production-possibility frontier
- Productive efficiency
- X-inefficiency
