= Albert Jeck =

German economist

Albert Jeck (* 3 July 1935 in Lindau) is a German economist.

== Life ==
Albert Jeck was the son of a teacher of the same name. From 1941 to 1953, he attended elementary and high school in his birthplace of Lindau at Lake Constance. He then studied national economy at the Ludwig-Maximilians-Universität München where he passed the diploma in economics in 1958 and worked as a research assistant at the State Economics Seminar the following year.

After the graduation to Dr. oec. publ. at the Ludwig-Maximilians-Universität München on 8 April 1962, and Habilitation there in 1968, from 1969 to 2000 he was Professor for Theoretical Economics and Director at the Institute for Economics at Kiel University. His work focused on distribution theory, growth theory and the history of theory.

== Publications (selection) ==
- Die Determinanten der Einkommensverteilung. Ein Beitrag zur neueren Verteilungstheorie. Munich 1962
- Wachstum und Verteilung des Volkseinkommens. Untersuchungen und Materialien zur Entwicklung der Einkommensverteilung in Deutschland 1870–1913. Mit 15 Abbildungen. Tübingen 1970, ISBN 3-16-330361-7.
- with Harald Hagemann: Wachstum und Einkommensverteilung. Strukturanalyse auf der Basis eines dreisektoralen Modells vom Lowe-Feldman-Dobb-Typ. Kiel 1981
- Anmerkungen und Lesehilfen zur Ricardo-Interpretation. Zahlenmodell und Detaildisposition der Principles. Kiel 1986
- The macrostructure of Adam Smith's theoretical system: a reconstruction. The European Journal of the History of Economic Thought, 1994, vol. 1 (3), pp. 551–576
