= Economic efficiency =

Situation in which nothing can be improved without something else being hurt

In microeconomics, economic efficiency, depending on the context, is usually one of the following two related concepts:

- Allocative or Pareto efficiency: any changes made to assist one person would harm another.
- Productive efficiency: no additional output of one good can be obtained without decreasing the output of another good, and production proceeds at the lowest possible average total cost.

These definitions are not equivalent: a market or other economic system may be allocatively but not productively efficient, or productively but not allocatively efficient. There are also other definitions and measures. All characterizations of economic efficiency are encompassed by the more general engineering concept that a system is efficient or optimal when it maximizes desired outputs (such as utility) given available inputs.

== Standards of thought ==
There are two main standards of thought on economic efficiency, which respectively emphasize the distortions created by governments (and reduced by decreasing government involvement) and the distortions created by markets (and reduced by increasing government involvement). These are at times competing, at times complementary—either debating the overall level of government involvement, or the effects of specific government involvement. Broadly speaking, this dialog takes place in the context of economic liberalism or neoliberalism, though these terms are also used more narrowly to refer to particular views, especially advocating laissez faire.

Further, there are differences in views on microeconomic versus macroeconomic efficiency, some advocating a greater role for government in one sphere or the other.

=== Allocative and productive efficiency ===
A market can be said to have allocative efficiency if the price of a product that the market is supplying is equal to the marginal value consumers place on it, and equals marginal cost. In other words, when every good or service is produced up to the point where one more unit provides a marginal benefit to consumers less than the marginal cost of producing it.

Because productive resources are scarce, the resources must be allocated to various industries in just the right amounts, otherwise too much or too little output gets produced. When drawing diagrams for businesses, allocative efficiency is satisfied if output is produced at the point where marginal cost is equal to average revenue. This is the case for the long-run equilibrium of perfect competition.

Productive efficiency occurs when units of goods are being supplied at the lowest possible average total cost. When drawing diagrams for businesses, this condition is satisfied if the equilibrium is at the minimum point of the average total cost curve. This is again the case for the long run equilibrium of perfect competition. For an extensive discussion of many other types of productive efficiency and its measures (Farrell, Hyperbolic, Directional, Cost, Revenue, Profit, Additive, etc.) and their relationships.

=== Mainstream views ===
The mainstream view is that market economies are generally believed to be closer to efficient than other known alternatives and that government involvement is necessary at the macroeconomic level (via fiscal policy and monetary policy) to counteract the economic cycle – following Keynesian economics. At the microeconomic level there is debate about how to achieve efficiency, with some advocating laissez-faire, to remove government distortions, while others advocate regulation, to reduce market failures and imperfections, particularly via internalizing externalities.

The first fundamental welfare theorem provides some basis for the belief in efficiency of market economies, as it states that any perfectly competitive market equilibrium is Pareto efficient. The assumption of perfect competition means that this result is only valid in the absence of market imperfections, which are significant in real markets. Furthermore, Pareto efficiency is a minimal notion of optimality and does not necessarily result in a socially desirable distribution of resources, as it makes no statement about equality or the overall well-being of a society.

=== Schools of thought ===
Advocates of limited government, in the form laissez-faire (little or no government role in the economy) follow from the 19th century philosophical tradition classical liberalism. They are particularly associated with the mainstream economic schools of classical economics (through the 1870s) and neoclassical economics (from the 1870s onwards), and with the heterodox Austrian school.

Advocates of an expanded government role follow instead in alternative streams of progressivism; in the Anglosphere (English-speaking countries, notably the United States, United Kingdom, Canada, Australia and New Zealand) this is associated with institutional economics and, at the macroeconomic level, with Keynesian economics. In Germany the guiding philosophy is Ordoliberalism, in the Freiburg School of economics.

=== Microeconomic reform ===
Microeconomic reform is the implementation of policies that aim to reduce economic distortions via deregulation, and move toward economic efficiency. However, there is no clear theoretical basis for the belief that removing a market distortion will always increase economic efficiency.

The theory of the second best states that if there is some unavoidable market distortion in one sector, a move toward greater market perfection in another sector may actually decrease efficiency.

== Criteria ==
Economic efficiency can be characterized in many ways:

- Allocative efficiency
- Distributive efficiency
- Dynamic efficiency
- Kaldor–Hicks efficiency
- Operational efficiency
- Pareto efficiency
- Productive efficiency
- Optimisation of a social welfare function
- Utility maximization
- X-inefficiency

Applications of these principles include:

- Efficient-market hypothesis
- Microeconomic reform
- Production theory basics
- Welfare economics

== See also ==
- Business efficiency
- Compensation principle
- Distribution (economics)
- Economic equilibrium
- Pareto efficiency
- Uneconomic growth
- Zero-sum game
