= Robin Sickles =

American economist

Robin C. Sickles
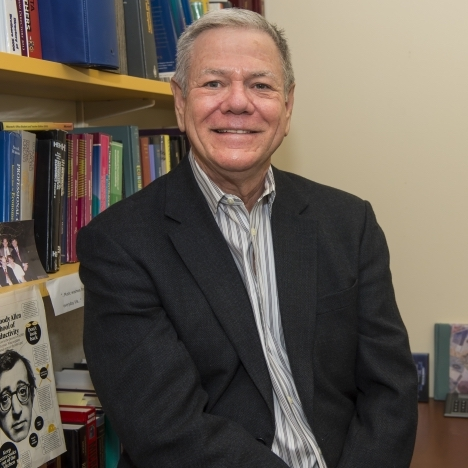

Academic background
- Education: Georgia Institute of Technology; University of North Carolina, Chapel Hill
- Doctoral advisor: Peter Schmidt

Academic work
- Discipline: Econometrics
- Institutions: Rice University
- Website: Information at IDEAS / RePEc

Robin C. Sickles is an American economist.

== Life and work ==
He has worked extensively in modeling productivity and efficiency and health outcomes and risk factors that impact health. His research provides new methodological approaches to model and measure complicated economic behaviors and outcomes. His work also focuses on the role that econometrics plays in policy issues, such as market regulation, market transition, and deterrence versus preventive measures in the criminal justice system. After graduating from Georgia Institute of Technology in 1972 (B.S., Economics), he earned a Ph.D. in economics in 1976 from the University of North Carolina, Chapel Hill. He is the Reginald Henry Hargrove Chair in Economics emeritus and professor statistics emeritus at Rice University. He is a Fellow of the Journal of Econometrics and the International Association of Applied Econometrics, has served as the editor-in-chief for the Journal of Productivity Analysis, and has held positions as associate editor for the Journal of Econometrics, Journal of Business and Economic Statistics, Journal of Applied Econometrics, and Empirical Economics, among others. He has co-authored and edited eleven books, volumes, journal special issues related to applied econometric topics, over 100 articles in peer-reviewed journals, and over 50 chapters in handbooks and other volumes. His most recent major work is Measurement of Productivity and Efficiency: Theory and Practice ( with Valentin Zelenyuk. New York: Cambridge University Press, 2019.)

== Publications ==
He has authored and/or edited 11 books, volumes and special issues, published in journals such as Econometrica, Journal of Econometrics, Journal of Applied Econometrics, Review of Economics and Statistics, American Economic Review, International Economic Review, Journal of Business and Economic Statistics, Journal of Labor Economics, The Economic Journal and Journal of Human Resources, among others. Some of his most recent and prominent publications are:

- Bada, O; Gualtieri, J; Kneip, A; Sickles, R (2021). "Panel Data Models with Multiple Jump Discontinuities in the Parameters". Journal of Econometrics.
- Sickles, R; Sun, K; Triebs, T (2021). "The Optimal Use of Management". Economic Inquiry. 59 (3): 1346–1363. doi:10.1111/ecin.12979.
- Gong, B; Sickles, R (2021). "Resource Allocation in Multidivisional Multiproduct Firms: Examining the Divisional Productivity of Energy Companies". Journal of Productivity Analysis. 55 (2). doi:10.1007/s11123-020-00595-5. S2CID 254934397.
- Gong, B; Sickles, R (2020). "Non-Structural and Structural Models in Productivity Analysis: Study of the British Isles during the 2007-2009 Financial Crisis". Journal of Productivity Analysis. 53 (2): 243–263. doi:10.1007/s11123-019-00571-8. S2CID 254933124.
- Shang, A; Sickles, R (2020). "Non-Structural Analysis of Productivity Growth for the Industrialized Countries: A Jackknife Model Averaging Approach". Econometric Reviews.
- Glass, A; Kenjegalieva, K; Sickles, R (2016). "Spatial Autoregressive and Spatial Durbin Stochastic Frontier Models for Panel Data". Journal of Econometrics. 190 (2). doi:10.1016/j.jeconom.2015.06.011. S2CID 18094207.
- Kutlu, L; Sickles, R (2012). "Estimation of Market Power in the Presence of Firm Level Inefficiencies". Journal of Econometrics. 168 (1): 141–155. doi:10.1016/j.jeconom.2011.11.001.
- Williams, J; Sickles, R (2008). "Turning from Crime: A Dyanamic perspective". Journal of Econometrics.
- Park, B; Simar, L; Sickles, R (2003). "Semiparametric Efficient Estimation of Panel Models with AR(1) Errors". Journal of Econometrics.
- Park, B; Simar, L; Sickles, R (1998). "Stochastic Panel Frontiers: A Semiparametric Approach". Journal of Econometrics. 84 (2): 273–301. doi:10.1016/S0304-4076(97)00087-0. hdl:2078/120917.
- Huh, K; Sickles, R (1994). "Estimation of the Duration Model by Nonparametric Maximum Likelihood, Maximum Penalized Likelihood and Probability Simulators". Review of Economics and Statistics. 76 (4): 683–694. doi:10.2307/2109770. JSTOR 2109770.
- Taubman, P; Sickles, R (1991). "A Profile of Illegal Drug Users". American Economic Review.
- Cornwell, C; Schmidt, P; Sickles, R (1990). "Production Frontiers with Cross-Sectional and Time Series Variation in Efficiency Levels". Journal of Econometrics. 46 (1–2): 185–200. doi:10.1016/0304-4076(90)90054-W.
- Good, D; Johnson, R; Sickles, R (1986). "Allocative Distortions and the Regulatory Transition of the U.S. Airline Industry". Journal of Econometrics.
- Akin, J; Guilkey, D; Sickles, R (1979). "A Random Coefficient Probit Model With an Application to a Study of Migration". Journal of Econometrics. 11 (2–3): 233–246. doi:10.1016/0304-4076(79)90038-1. PMID 12262990.
- Schmidt, P; Sickles, R (1977). "Some Further Evidence on the Use of the Chow Test Under Heteroskedasticity". Econometrica. 45 (5): 1293–1298. doi:10.2307/1914076. JSTOR 1914076.

== Academic and editorial work ==
- He is a Fellow of the International Association of Applied Econometrics
- He is a Fellow of the Journal of Econometrics
- He is a Founding President of the International Society for Efficiency and Productivity Analysis
- He is a member of the Conference on Research in Income and Wealth, National Bureau of Economic Research
- In 2008 he was listed in top 100 econometricians in the world ranked by the number of all econometric articles, 1989–2005 in WORLDWIDE ECONOMETRICS RANKINGS: 1989-2005 (Badi H. Baltagi, Econometric Theory)
- He served as the editor-in-chief for the Journal of Productivity Analysis from 2002 to 2012.
- He served as an Associate Editor/ Editorial Board member for the Journal Of Econometrics (2000–2019).
- He served as an associate editor for the Journal of Business and Economics Statistics (1998–2007)
- He served as an associate editor for Empirical Economics (2000–2019)
