= Efficiency =

Degree to which a process minimizes waste of resources

Efficiency is the often measurable ability to avoid making mistakes or wasting materials, energy, efforts, money, and time while performing a task. In a more general sense, it is the ability to do things well, successfully, and without waste.

In more mathematical or scientific terms, it signifies the level of performance that uses the least inputs to achieve the highest amount of output. It often specifically comprises the capability of a specific application of effort to produce a specific outcome with a minimum amount or quantity of waste, expense, or unnecessary effort. Efficiency refers to very different inputs and outputs in different fields and industries. In 2019, the European Commission said: "Resource efficiency means using the Earth's limited resources in a sustainable manner while minimising impacts on the environment. It allows us to create more with less and to deliver greater value with less input."

Writer Deborah Stone notes that efficiency is "not a goal in itself. It is not something we want for its own sake, but rather because it helps us attain more of the things we value."

== Efficiency and effectiveness ==
Efficiency is very often confused with effectiveness. In general, efficiency is a measurable concept, quantitatively determined by the ratio of useful output to total useful input. Effectiveness is the simpler concept of being able to achieve a desired result, which can be expressed quantitatively but does not usually require more complicated mathematics than addition. Efficiency can often be expressed as a percentage of the result that could ideally be expected, for example if no energy were lost due to friction or other causes, in which case 100% of fuel or other input would be used to produce the desired result. In some cases efficiency can be indirectly quantified with impulse.

A common but confusing way of distiguishing between efficiency and effectiveness is the saying "Efficiency is doing things right, while effectiveness is doing the right things". This saying indirectly emphasizes that the selection of objectives of a production process is just as important as the quality of that process. This saying popular in business, however, obscures the more common sense of "effectiveness", which would/should produce the following mnemonic: "Efficiency is doing things right; effectiveness is getting things done". This makes it clear that effectiveness, for example large production numbers, can also be achieved through inefficient processes if, for example, workers are willing or used to working longer hours or with greater physical effort than in other companies or countries or if they can be forced to do so. Similarly, a company can achieve effectiveness, for example large production numbers, through inefficient processes if it can afford to use more energy per product, for example if energy prices or labor costs or both are lower than for its competitors.

== Inefficiency ==
Inefficiency is the absence of efficiency. Kinds of inefficiency include:

- Allocative inefficiency refers to a situation in which the distribution of resources between alternatives does not fit with consumer taste (perceptions of costs and benefits). For example, a company may have the lowest costs in "productive" terms, but the result may be inefficient in allocative terms because the "true" or social cost exceeds the price that consumers are willing to pay for an extra unit of the product. This is true, for example, if the firm produces pollution (see also external cost). Consumers would prefer that the firm and its competitors produce less of the product and charge a higher price, to internalize the external cost.
- Distributive inefficiency refers to the inefficient distribution of income and wealth within a society. Decreasing marginal utilities of wealth, in theory, suggests that more egalitarian distributions of wealth are more efficient than inegalitarian distributions. Distributive inefficiency is often associated with economic inequality.
- Economic inefficiency refers to a situation where "we could be doing a better job," i.e., attaining our goals at lower cost. It is the opposite of economic efficiency. In the latter case, there is no way to do a better job, given the available resources and technology. Sometimes, this type of economic efficiency is referred to as the Koopmans efficiency.
- Keynesian inefficiency might be defined as incomplete use of resources (labor, capital goods, natural resources, etc.) because of inadequate aggregate demand. We are not attaining potential output, while suffering from cyclical unemployment. We could do a better job if we applied deficit spending or expansionary monetary policy.
- Pareto inefficiency is a situation in which one person can not be made better off without making anyone else worse off. In practice, this criterion is difficult to apply in a constantly changing world, so many emphasize Kaldor-Hicks efficiency and inefficiency: a situation is inefficient if someone can be made better off even after compensating those made worse off, regardless of whether the compensation actually occurs.
- Productive inefficiency says that we could produce the given output at a lower cost—or could produce more output for a given cost. For example, a company that is inefficient will have higher operating costs and will be at a competitive disadvantage (or have lower profits than other firms in the market). See Sickles and Zelenyuk (2019, Chapter 3) for more extensive discussions.
- Resource-market inefficiency refers to barriers that prevent full adjustment of resource markets, so that resources are either unused or misused. For example, structural unemployment results from barriers of mobility in labor markets which prevent workers from moving to places and occupations where there are job vacancies. Thus, unemployed workers can co-exist with unfilled job vacancies.
- X-inefficiency refers to inefficiency in the "black box" of production, connecting inputs to outputs. This type of inefficiency says that we could be organizing people or production processes more effectively. Often problems of "morale" or "bureaucratic inertia" cause X-inefficiency.

Productive inefficiency, resource-market inefficiency, and X-inefficiency might be analyzed using data envelopment analysis and similar methods.

== Mathematical expression ==
Efficiency is often measured as the ratio of useful output to total input, which can be expressed with the mathematical formula r=P/C, where P is the amount of useful output ("product") produced per the amount C ("cost") of resources consumed. This may correspond to a percentage if products and consumables are quantified in compatible units, and if consumables are transformed into products via a conservative process. For example, in the analysis of the energy conversion efficiency of heat engines in thermodynamics, the product P may be the amount of useful work output, while the consumable C is the amount of high-temperature heat input. Due to the conservation of energy, P can never be greater than C, and so the efficiency r is never greater than 100% (and in fact must be even less at finite temperatures).

== In science and technology ==
=== In physics ===
- Useful work per quantity of energy, mechanical advantage over ideal mechanical advantage, often denoted by the Greek lowercase letter η (Eta):
  - Electrical efficiency
  - Energy conversion efficiency
  - Mechanical efficiency
  - Thermal efficiency, ratio of work done to thermal energy consumed
  - Thermodynamic efficiency: ratio between actual work and ideal work
- Efficient energy use, the objective of maximising efficiency
  - In thermodynamics:
    - Energy conversion efficiency, measure of second law thermodynamic loss
  - Radiation efficiency, ratio of radiated power to power absorbed at the terminals of an antenna
  - Volumetric efficiency, in internal combustion engine design
- Lift-to-drag ratio
- Faraday efficiency, electrolysis
- Quantum efficiency, a measure of sensitivity of a photosensitive device
- Grating efficiency, a generalization of the reflectance of a mirror, extended to a diffraction grating

=== In economics ===
- Productivity improving technologies
- Economic efficiency, the extent to which waste or other undesirable features are avoided
- Market efficiency, the extent to which a given market resembles the ideal of an efficient market
  - Pareto efficiency, a state of its being impossible to make one individual better off, without making any other individual worse off
  - Kaldor-Hicks efficiency, a less stringent version of Pareto efficiency
  - Allocative efficiency, the optimal distribution of goods
  - Efficiency wages, paying workers more than the market rate for increased productivity
- Business efficiency, revenues relative to expenses, etc.
- Efficiency Movement, of the Progressive Era (1890–1932), advocated efficiency in the economy, society and government

=== In other sciences ===
- In computing:
  - Algorithmic efficiency, optimizing the speed and memory requirements of a computer program.
  - A non-functional requirement (criterion for quality) in systems design and systems architecture which says something about the resource consumption for given load
  - Efficiency factor, in data communications
  - Storage efficiency, effectiveness of computer data storage
- Efficiency (statistics), a measure of desirability of an estimator
- Material efficiency, compares material requirements between construction projects or physical processes
- Administrative efficiency, measuring transparency within public authorities and simplicity of rules and procedures for citizens and businesses
- In biology:
  - Photosynthetic efficiency
  - Ecological efficiency

== See also ==
- Jevons paradox
