= Conflict continuum =

Concept in social science

A conflict continuum is a model or concept various social science researchers use when modeling conflict on a continuum from low to high-intensity, such as from aggression to irritation to explosiveness.

The mathematical model of game theory (Note: von Neumann and Morgenstern (1944) Theory of Games and Economic Behavior) originally posited only a winner and a loser (a zero-sum game) in a conflict, but was extended to cooperation (a win-win situation and a non-zero sum game), (Note: Simplest 2-player Nonzero Sum Game: Book review by Copeland (1945)) and lets users specify any point on a scale between cooperation, peace, (Note: A state of Nash equilibrium) rivalry, contest, crisis, and conflict among stakeholders.

== Overview ==
By the decade of the 2010s, military planners realized that additional capabilities in communications, sensors, and weapons countermeasures made it possible for competitors to react to a contestant's moves in the "gray zone" just short of conflict. In 2018, Kelly McCoy identified a continuum within competition itself, as explored in the United States Joint Staff's Joint Concept for Integrated Campaigning (JCIC), up to the point just short of armed conflict, while noting Perkins' connection to deterrence in the continuum. In 2020, Donald Stoker and Craig Whiteside cautioned that for strategists, the "gray zone" must not blur peace and war; they offered an analysis of the need for strategists to clearly distinguish peace, competition, contest, conflict, and war.

Standoff is the condition of deadlock between antagonists, (Note: In game theory, a Nash equilibrium is an array of strategies, one for each player, such that no player can obtain a higher payoff by switching to a different strategy while the strategies of all other players are held fixed.) sometimes measured by the distance between them (standoff distance). For n antagonists in a non-zero sum game, von Neumann and Morgenstern showed in 1944 that this condition is equivalent to a zero-sum game with n+1 antagonists, where the n+1st player ("the fictitious player") is not an entity. Rather, the fictitious player represents the global profit (or loss) of the n players in the non-zero sum game. If we reduce this game to a zero-sum 3-player game by the introduction of a fictitious player 3, then the characteristic function becomes the one given. In Tibor Scitovsky's terminology (more commonly known as the Kaldor–Hicks criterion), this global profit (or loss) of the n+1st player represents the amount that the gainers would have been prepared to pay to the losers (or, in a global loss, the global amount that the n players have lost in total), in order to attain a desired global policy.

Overmatch is the condition where protagonist A is able to present multiple dilemmas to an antagonist E. Thus, if E can recognize that E risks total destruction (annihilation), then it is possible to bring an end to conflict between A and E. If A can bring about overmatch for all E's, the hegemony of A would result, temporarily. In other confrontations between A and the Es, deterrence can be the mutual recognition that power need not be used to destroy one another (mutually assured destruction). Instead, A might display or project its power to the Es as a substitute for battle with them. If A's power can remain leashed (potential rather than kinetic) (Note: In light of the 2022 Russian invasion of Ukraine US Defense Secretary 'Austin pointed to early failures by Russia, including almost immediate struggles with logistics, and difficulties getting food, water and supplies to troops'.) then soft power and hard power are also optional possibilities on a continuum of possible conflict between A and the Es.

== Various continuum models ==
=== Elise Boulding's conflict continuum ===
Elise M. Boulding was a Quaker sociologist influenced by the events of World War II. Examining how war becomes peace, she posited a continuum between wars of extermination and transformation.

This is Boulding's conflict continuum:

War of extermination
Limited war
Threat systems (deterrence)
Arbitration
Mediation
Negotiation (exchange)
Mutual adaptation
Alliance
Co-operation
Integration
Transformation

=== Andra Medea's types of conflict ===
Theorist Andra Medea seeks to explain how individuals, small groups, organizations, families, ethnicities, and even whole nations function when disputes arise between them. She posits that there are four types or levels of conflict, each operating under distinct rules:

(1) Problem Solving	(2) Domination	(3) Blind Behavior	(4) Rogue Messiah

Each level moving from first to fourth is characterized by increasing degrees of separation from reality, and decreasing degrees of maturity, in this context, defined as the ability to control anger and settle differences without violence or destruction. Problem-solving behavior is based in reality and maturity, and is therefore more rational and mature than domination. Domination is more rational and mature than blind behavior, which is more rational and mature than the Rogue Messiah.

However, each level moving from fourth to first is more capable than the one below it at forcing victory in a conflict. The rogue messiah overpowers blind behavior, blind behavior thwarts domination, and domination deadlocks problem-solving.

=== Perkins' continuum of conflict ===
Conflict continuum: competition short of conflict, conflict itself, and the return to competition, possibly via deterrence —Gen. David G. Perkins

Before 2017, winning a conflict was seen as the objective of the US Army. By 2018, the US Air Force showed it is important to reformulate this strategy, as part of a larger process of multi-domain operations (MDO), (Note: The US Army's unclassified Multi-Domain Operations (MDO) concept is "the combined arms employment of capabilities from all domains that create and exploit relative advantages to defeat enemy forces, achieve objectives and consolidate gains during competition, crisis, and armed conflict".) which involve more than an army in a theater of war (World War II and Cold War model). Specifically, MDO can offer options short of war, which can defuse armed conflict from total war into deterrence, compromise, or cooperation between competitors.

Multi-domain operations occur as overlapped, integrated operation of cyberspace, (Note: In 2018 new cyber authorities were granted under National Security Presidential Memorandum (NSPM) 13; persistent cyber engagements at Cyber Command are the new norm for cyber operations.) space (including satellite operations), land, maritime, and air. A multi-domain task force was set up in 2018 in I Corps for the Pacific. Multi-domain battalions, which first stood up in 2019, comprise a single unit for air, land, space, and cyber domains.

The MDO model recognizes that near-peer competitors might not actually seek conflict with each other, but perhaps merely a near-term advantage in order to buy time for themselves in the face of overmatch. For example, the X-37B space plane can change its orbit; this capability has military applications. On July 15, 2020, Cosmos 2543 emitted a kinetic vehicle, which emitted a tertiary object. This maneuver is interpreted as a test of anti-satellite capability. Cosmos 2542 has been tailing USA-245, a KH-11. Other multi-domain operations short of war, but still escalating the conflict, might include the shooting-down of military drones. By May 2023, a robotic Chinese space plane (similar to the X-37B) in orbit from October 2022 to May 2023 had successfully released, and then recaptured an orbiting object. In August 2023, USSF Space Systems Command and the NRO revealed countermeasures to China's maneuverable space vehicles that are in geosynchronous orbit.

Other operations short of war in 2018 include undeclared conflicts, involving proxy military units funded by oligarchs, (Note: Erdogan bluntly informed Putin in a phone conversation that Turkey would react "in the harshest way" to any future attacks on its forces. The proxies are across Turkey's border from Idlib (Syria), which is largely held by Syrian fighters allied to al-Qaeda and rebels backed by Ankara (Turkey).) but specifically disclaimed by near-peer competitors. This is in direct response to the strategy which the US has promulgated since 1949.

Destruction of infrastructure such as fuel pipelines, the energy grid, or the GPS network, or the financial markets, or confidence in national law and order may be goals for partners, competitors, or adversaries, depending on where they might be in the continuum of conflict. Directed energy attacks on US embassies, and even the White House are cropping up, as reported in April 2021.

Conflicts of belief, and conflicts of their underlying narratives can lead to social disorder, sometimes resulting in depression or suicide. Thus, disinformation could be a tactic in the spectrum of conflict.

=== Competition continuum ===
In 2021, the 40th Chief of Staff of the United States Army identified three dimensions of military competition: 1) narrative, 2) direct (zero-sum), and 3) indirect (non-zero sum) competition. Narrative competition shapes and frames a baseline within which direct, or indirect competition with adversaries are related. In progressive stages of the narrative, allies, partners, neutral parties, observers, and rivals are encouraged to cooperate with the protagonist. Alternatively, adversaries are deterred from military conflict against the protagonist.

If an adversary persists in direct competition, the protagonist simply continues to advance with direct competition, thereby gaining leverage over the adversary. The protagonist might find it possible only to impede the adversary; in this case, allies and partners may interoperate against the adversary for mutual advantage with the protagonist.

If rivals or adversaries persist in indirect competition, the protagonists seek advantage over them by building relationships with cooperating allies, partners, neutral parties, or observers; in addition, the protagonists keep a forward presence in the theater; the protagonists also must keep their capabilities relevant, competitive, and current. Cost becomes a factor, as adversaries learn by simply trying to keep up. Eventually indirect competition could stabilize; however, the 40th Chief of Staff notes competition is an infinite game.
