= Scitovsky paradox =

The Scitovsky paradox is a paradox in welfare economics which is resolved by stating that there is no increase in social welfare by a return to the original part of the losers. It is named after the Hungarian born American economist, Tibor Scitovsky.

According to Scitovsky, Kaldor-Hicks criterion involves contradictory and inconsistent results. What Scitovsky demonstrated was it is possible that if an allocation A is deemed superior to another allocation B by the Kaldor compensation criteria, then by a subsequent set of moves by the same criteria, we can prove that B is also superior to A.

The paradox occurs when the gainer from the change of allocation A to allocation B can compensate the loser for making the change, but the loser could also then compensate the gainer for going back to the original position. Scitovsky pointed out that to get at the correct criterion of welfare we must remove this contradiction. He has therefore offered his own criterion called the “Scitovsky Double criterion”.

The Scitovsky criterion was developed by Tibor Scitovsky in his paper “A Note on Welfare Propositions in Economics”, 1941.
