= Anne A. Scitovsky =

American health economist

- Born: Anne Aickelin; April 17, 1915; Ludwigshafen, Germany
- Died: January 6, 2012 (aged 96); California
- Citizenship: United States
- Education: Barnard College; Columbia University
- Spouse: Tibor Scitovsky (divorced)
- Scientific career
- Fields: Health economics
- Workplaces: Palo Alto Medical Foundation

Anne Aickelin Scitovsky (April 17, 1915 – January 16, 2012) was an American health economist. She was associated with the Palo Alto Medical Foundation for most of her career and was a member of the National Academy of Medicine.

== Biography ==
Scitovsky was born in Ludwigshafen, Germany, on April 17, 1915, and emigrated to the United States when she was 15 with her family. She earned her bachelor's degree from Barnard College in 1937 and master's degree from Columbia University in 1941. During World War II, she worked at the Social Security Administration with Selma Mushkin, an early pioneer in the field of health economics. During the 1950s and 60s, she was a homemaker and spent time raising her daughter.

In 1963, Scitovsky was invited to join the Palo Alto Medical Foundation to develop a program on health economics. She remained with the institute for the next 30 years. Her research has focused on the changing medical costs of the elderly and people with aids, allowing her to estimate the impact of the changes in technology on medical costs. She also published studies showing that demand for healthcare is influenced by what people have to pay for it long before the RAND Corporation launched its health insurance study.

In 1979, Scitovsky was appointed by Jimmy Carter as one of the 11 members of the President's Commission for the Study of Ethical Problems in Medicine and Biomedical and Behavioral Research.

In 1980, Scitovsky was elected a member of the Institute Of Medicine of the National Academy of Sciences.

== Personal life ==
Scitovsky was married to economist Tibor Scitovsky. She died on January 16, 2012, in California.
