= Welfare economics =

Field of economics to evaluate well-being

Welfare economics is a field of economics that applies microeconomic techniques to evaluate the overall well-being (welfare) of a society.

The principles of welfare economics are often used to inform public economics, which focuses on the ways in which government intervention can improve social welfare. Additionally, welfare economics serves as the theoretical foundation for several instruments of public economics, such as cost–benefit analysis. The intersection of welfare economics and behavioral economics has given rise to the subfield of behavioral welfare economics.

Two fundamental theorems are associated with welfare economics. The first states that competitive markets, under certain assumptions, lead to Pareto efficient outcomes. This idea is sometimes referred to as Adam Smith's invisible hand. The second theorem states that with further restrictions, any Pareto efficient outcome can be achieved through a competitive market equilibrium, provided that a social planner uses a social welfare function to choose the most equitable efficient outcome and then uses lump sum transfers followed by competitive trade to achieve it. Arrow's impossibility theorem which is closely related to social choice theory, is sometimes considered a third fundamental theorem of welfare economics.

== History ==
In 1951, Kenneth Arrow tested whether rational collective selection rules could derive social welfare functions from individuals in preference to social states. He argued that rational law satisfies four conditions: partial universality, the Pareto principle, totalitarianism, and free will. Arrow concluded that there is no rational way to articulate individual preferences forms together resulting in a harmonious social status of the various social societies.

More recently, Amartya Sen later emphasized the nature of the sequential gain approach, and Arrow's theory emphasized it. Sen said collective action often arises in social decision-making, because Arrow's theory is delivered through the aggregate of individual preferences rather than the formation of government or income, especially those that exist because of neutrality, presented a challenge to reconcile conflicting interests in revenue sharing. The neutral results, avoiding special utility issues, restricted the social analysis to structural utility issues. This restriction did not exclude important information about an individual’s social status or position needed to make an income allocation decision. Sen recommended expanding the scope of data used in welfare research and emphasized the need for explicit discussion of ethics and morality in welfare economics.

== Theoretical basis ==
=== Cardinal utility ===
The early Neoclassical approach was developed by Edgeworth, Sidgwick, Marshall, and Pigou. It assumes the following:

- Utility is cardinal, that is, scale-measurable by observation or judgment,
- Preferences are exogenously given and stable,
- Additional consumption provides smaller and smaller increases in utility (diminishing marginal utility).

With these assumptions, it is possible to construct a social welfare function simply by summing all the individual utility functions. Note that such a measure would still be concerned with the distribution of income (distributive efficiency) but not the distribution of final utilities. In normative terms, such authors were writing in the Benthamite tradition.

=== Behavioralist approach ===
The ordinal-behaviorist approach, originally called the new welfare economics, is based on the work of Pareto, Kaldor, Hicks, and Scitovsky. It explicitly recognizes the differences between the efficiency aspect of the discipline and the distribution aspect and treats them differently. Questions of efficiency are assessed with criteria such as Pareto efficiency and Kaldor–Hicks efficiency, while questions of income distribution are covered in the specification of the social welfare function Further, efficiency dispenses with cardinal measures of utility, replacing it with ordinal utility, which merely ranks commodity bundles (with an indifference-curve map, for example).

The consensus in favor of such approaches, pushed by behavioralists of the 1930s and 40s, has largely collapsed since the discovery of Arrow's impossibility theorem and utility representation theorems have shown them to be mathematically self-contradictory, violating the principle of transitive preferences.

Austrian school economists critique the foundations of both cardinal and ordinal approaches to welfare economics for relying on interpersonal comparisons of utility or aggregated social welfare functions, which they argue are incompatible with methodological subjectivism. Murray Rothbard, in particular, proposed a reconstruction of welfare economics based solely on "demonstrated preference," under which only voluntary market exchanges can be judged unambiguously welfare-enhancing. Centralized attempts to maximize social welfare via planner interventions face insurmountable knowledge and economic calculation problems.

== Criteria ==
=== Efficiency ===
Situations are considered to have distributive efficiency when goods are distributed to the people who can gain the most utility from them. Pareto efficiency is an efficiency goal that is standard in economics. A situation is Pareto-efficient only if no individual can be made better off without making someone else worse off. An example of an inefficient situation would be if Smith owns an apple but would prefer to consume an orange, while Jones owns an orange but would prefer to consume an apple. Both could be made better off by trading.

A Pareto-efficient state of affairs can only come about if four criteria are met:

- The marginal rates of substitution in consumption for any two goods are identical for all consumers. We cannot reallocate goods between two consumers and make both happier.
- The marginal rate of transformation in production for any two goods is identical for all producers of those two goods. We cannot reallocate production between two producers and increase total output.
- The marginal physical product of a factor input (e.g. labor) must be the same for all producers of a good. We cannot reduce production cost by reallocating production between two producers.
- The marginal rates of substitution in consumption equal the marginal rates of transformation in production for any pair of goods. Producers cannot make consumers happier by producing more of one good and less of the other.

There are a number of conditions that can lead to inefficiency. They include:

- Imperfect market structures such as monopoly, monopsony, oligopoly, oligopsony, and monopolistic competition.
- Factor allocation inefficiencies in production theory basics.
- Externalities.
- Asymmetric information, including principal–agent problems.
- Long run declining average costs in a natural monopoly.
- Taxes and tariffs.
- Government restrictions on prices and quantities sold and other regulation resulting from government failure.

Note that if one of these conditions leads to inefficiency, another condition might help by counteracting it. For example, if a pollution externality leads to overproduction of tires, a tax on tires might restore the efficient level of production. A condition inefficient in the "first-best" might be desirable in the second-best.

To determine whether an activity is moving the economy towards Pareto efficiency, two compensation tests have been developed. Policy changes usually help some people while hurting others, so these tests ask what would happen if the winners were to compensate the losers. Using the Kaldor criterion, the change is desirable if the maximum amount the winners would be willing to pay is greater than the minimum the losers would accept. Under the Hicks criterion, the change is desirable if the maximum the losers would be willing to offer the winners to prevent the change is less than the minimum the winners would accept as a bribe to give up the change. The Hicks compensation test is from the losers' point of view; the Kaldor compensation test is from the winners'. If both conditions are satisfied, the proposed change will move the economy toward Pareto optimality. This idea is known as Kaldor–Hicks efficiency. If the two conditions disagree, that yields the Scitovsky paradox.

== Results ==
=== Fundamental theorems ===
The field of welfare economics is associated with two fundamental theorems. The first states that given certain assumptions, competitive markets (price equilibria with transfers, e.g. Walrasian equilibria) produce Pareto efficient outcomes. The assumptions required are generally characterised as "very weak". More specifically, the existence of competitive equilibrium implies both price-taking behaviour and complete markets, but the only additional assumption is the local non-satiation of agents' preferences – that consumers would like, at the margin, to have slightly more of any given good. The first fundamental theorem is said to capture the logic of Adam Smith's invisible hand, though in general there is no reason to suppose that the "best" Pareto efficient point (of which there are a set) will be selected by the market without intervention, only that some such point will be.

The second fundamental theorem states that given further restrictions, any Pareto efficient outcome can be supported as a competitive market equilibrium. These restrictions are stronger than for the first fundamental theorem, with convexity of preferences and production functions a sufficient but not necessary condition. A direct consequence of the second theorem is that a benevolent social planner could use a system of lump sum transfers to ensure that the "best" Pareto efficient allocation was supported as a competitive equilibrium for some set of prices. More generally, it suggests that redistribution should, if possible, be achieved without affecting prices (which should continue to reflect relative scarcity), thus ensuring that the final (post-trade) result is efficient. Put into practice, such a policy might resemble predistribution.

Because of welfare economics' close ties to social choice theory, Arrow's impossibility theorem is sometimes listed as a third fundamental theorem of welfare.

=== Social welfare maximization ===
The social welfare function formally represents society's normative assessment of different economic situations, where the interest of individuals can be uniquely characterized or considered.

Utility functions can be derived from the points on a contract curve. Numerous utility functions can be derived, one for each point on the production possibility frontier (PQ in the diagram above). A social utility frontier (also called a grand utility frontier) can be obtained from the outer envelope of all these utility functions. Each point on a social utility frontier represents an efficient allocation of an economy's resources; that is, it is a Pareto optimum in factor allocation, in production, in consumption, and in the interaction of production and consumption (supply and demand). In the diagram below, the curve MN is a social utility frontier. Point D corresponds with point C from the earlier diagram. Point D is on the social utility frontier because the marginal rate of substitution at point C is equal to the marginal rate of transformation at point A. Point E corresponds with point B in the previous diagram, and lies inside the social utility frontier (indicating inefficiency) because the MRS at point C is not equal to the MRT at point A.

Although all the points on the grand social utility frontier are Pareto efficient, only one point identifies where social welfare is maximized. Such point is called "the point of bliss". This point is Z where the social utility frontier MN is tangent to the highest possible social indifference curve labelled SI.

=== Equity-efficiency trade-off ===
One essential result in understanding the distributional impacts of normative welfare choices is what is referred to as the equity-efficiency tradeoff. Because policies that redistribute income (or savings) in the economy are costly, there is an inherent choice between increasing the efficiency and equity within an economy. As a result of this implication, a significant amount of economic research has focused on studying the efficiency losses from tax and transfer programs, which are inherently redistributional.

== See also ==
- Fundamental theorems of welfare economics
- Deadweight loss
- Distribution (economics)
- Economic surplus
- Equity (economics)
- General equilibrium theory
- Gini coefficient
- Justice (economics)
- Kaldor–Hicks efficiency
- Macroeconomics
- Median income
- Pareto efficiency
- Perfect competition
- Social choice theory
- Social safety net
- Social welfare function
