= Kathleen Thompson =

American dramatist (1946–2024)

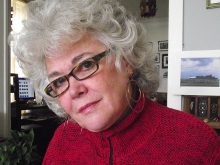
- Born: September 12, 1946; Chicago, Illinois, U.S.
- Died: December 21, 2024 (aged 78)
- Occupations: Writer, playwright, activist
- Writing career
- Subjects: Women's issues, multi-cultural American history, young adult books
- Notable works: Against Rape (1974), A Shining Thread of Hope (1998), The Face of Our Past (2000)
- Website: www.kathleenthompsonwriter.com

Kathleen Thompson (September 12, 1946 – December 21, 2024) was an American feminist, writer, and activist. She was first known for co-authoring with Andra Medea the feminist classic Against Rape (Farrar, Straus, 1974), the book that broke the silence about rape not only in the United States, but around the world. She exposed the American diet industry's exploitation of women in Feeding on Dreams (MacMillanUSA, 1994), written with psychologist Diane Pinkert Epstein.

She was co-author, with pre-eminent historian Darlene Clark Hine, of A Shining Thread of Hope: The History of Black Women in America. (Broadway Books, 1998), the first narrative history of black women in America. She then collaborated with Hilary MacAustin on three print documentaries of groups underrepresented in American history: The Face of Our Past: Images of Black Women from Colonial America to the Present (Indiana University Press, 1999), Children of the Depression (Indiana University Press, 2000), and America's Children: Repicturing Childhood from Exploration to the Present (W. W. Norton, 2001).

Thompson also served on the board of senior editors with Hine, Deborah Grey White, Brenda Stephenson, and other major scholars in the field on the second edition of the landmark encyclopedia Black Women in America (Oxford University Press, 2005). In addition to these adult trade books, she has written more than one hundred books for children and young adults and has had eleven plays produced in Chicago, New York City, and other cities.

Thompson's activism began in Oklahoma City during the Civil Rights Movement in 1963. She participated in anti-war activities that included the March on Washington for Peace in Vietnam in 1965. In 1969, she opened Chicago's first feminist bookstore, Pride and Prejudice, which later became the Women's Center of Chicago, of which she was a founding member. The Women's Center offered consciousness-group organizing, pregnancy testing, abortion counselling, an artists collective, and a number of other services for women. The Women's Center co-sponsored, with Chicago Lesbian Liberation, the first public all-woman dance event in Chicago, the Family of Women.

Thompson worked with Medea to present one of the first rape conferences in the country, which took place in 1972 at the Chicago Loop Young Women's Christian Association (YWCA), then under the leadership of feminist activist Diann Deweese Smith. She was also a founding member of Chicago Women Against Rape. With Austin, she co-founded OneHistory, an organization dedicated to making heard all the voices of American history. More recently, she was involved in anti-gang activism in the Logan Square neighborhood of Chicago.

== Against Rape ==
In April 1972, Andra Medea organized the Midwest's first conference on the subject of rape, held at the downtown YWCA. Inspired by that conference, Medea and Kathleen Thompson wrote the book Against Rape, which went through seven printings before its official publication date, was serialized in hundreds of newspapers around the country, and remained in print for eighteen years. It was widely used in rape crisis centers and women's studies courses and was the primary text for the self-defense courses for women of Chimera, Inc. for more than a decade. The focus of the book was to analyze the causes and patterns of rape to:

- reduce its power in the minds and lives of women;
- enable women and men to begin to change a society that engendered it; and
- help women avoid and/or survive the trauma of rape.

It was where Medea's innovative self-defense methods were first developed and published. According to Thompson, the writers kept in mind two criteria for their work. First, the book must be readable by the women they went to high school with. Second, it must avoid the sensationalism and fear-mongering that keep women from being able even to think about rape. They succeeded in both those aims while presenting a powerfully feminist analysis that pulled no punches about the sources of rape within the culture.

Two other important books on the subject were published in 1974—Rape: How to Avoid It and What to do About It If You Can't, by June Bundy Csida and Joseph Csida (Books for Better Living); and Rape: A First Sourcebook for Women by the New York Radical Feminists (New American Library). It was a time when women across the country were coming to terms with what Medea and Thompson call "all the hatred, contempt and oppression of women in this society concentrated in one act." Organizations similar to Chicago Women Against Rape were formed in other large cities and small towns. Women created and staffed rape crisis hotlines and worked to reform treatment of women in hospitals, by police and by courts. In 1975, Susan Brownmiller's Against Our Will added a profound historical and philosophical element to the discussion.

== A Shining Thread of Hope ==
The history of black women in America was long untold. In the last decades of the twentieth century, that began to change with books such as But Some of Us Are Brave (Feminist Press, 1982), edited by Gloria T. Hull, Patricia Bell-Scott, and Barbara Smith; Paula Giddings' When and Where I Enter (Harper Collins, 1984) and Deborah Gray White's Ar'nt I a Woman (W. W. Norton, 1985), as well as many others. In the 1990s, historian Darlene Clark Hine published widely in the field and encouraged the work of other scholars with publications such as the series Black Women in United States History. (Carlson Publishing, 1990) and Black Women in America: An Historical Encyclopedia (Carlson Publishing, 1992), which she edited with Elsa Barkley Brown and Rosalyn Terborg-Penn. After working with Hine on a young adult version of Black Women in America, Kathleen Thompson co-authored with her A Shining Thread of Hope. This was the first narrative history of black women in America and was hailed by Cornel West as "a canonical text for American historians." Historian Nell Irvin Painter said, "From time to time, a work of history itself makes history. A Shining Thread of Hope is such a book, marking a giant step in the creation of a more encompassing portrait of our nation's past."

== The Commons Theatre ==
In 1980, Thompson co-founded The Commons Theatre with actors Michael (Mike) Nowak and Judith Easton. The Commons was one of the early entries in Chicago's dynamic theater scene of the 1980s. Although it did not advertise the fact, its mission statement included a commitment to feminism, as well as to new plays. As artistic director, Thompson was one of the first women and one of the first playwrights to hold that position in a Chicago theater. In the six years she remained with The Commons, she had eight plays produced by the theatre, including the very successful Dashiell Hamlet, which she co-wrote with Mike Nussbaum, Mike Nowak, and Paul H. Thompson. Her plays have also been produced in a number of other theatres in Chicago and New York. She also taught playwriting with Nowak at Chicago Dramatists Workshop for ten years.

== Personal life ==
Thompson was born in Chicago in 1946 and lived from the age of five in Oklahoma City. Her father, Les Thompson, Jr., was a Methodist minister, and her mother, Frances Tracy Thompson, was an English teacher and, later, a reading specialist. She grew up with her two brothers, Paul and Mike, and two sisters, Tracy and Sara. She attended U. S. Grant High School in Oklahoma City, where her interest in cultural injustice began to form. She graduated from Northwestern University with a degree in philosophy in 1968 and began working at a number of jobs in an attempt to support herself while writing. After the publication of Against Rape, she spent a few years touring and talking about rape. She then decided to get as far away from the subject as possible and began writing comedy. For more than thirty years she wrote and edited educational material while writing her books and plays. She lived in Chicago, Illinois, with partner Mike Nowak, host of "The Mike Nowak Show" on WCPT Radio.

Thompson died on December 21, 2024, after a three-year battle with cancer, at the age of 78.

== Adult trade books ==
- Against Rape, with Andra Medea. New York: Farrar, Straus & Giroux, 1974.
- Feeding on Dreams, with Diane Epstein. New York: MacMillanUSA, 1994.
- Encyclopedia of Black Women, editor-in-chief, with editor Darlene Clark Hine. New York: Facts on File, 1997
- A Shining Thread of Hope: The History of Black Women in America, with Darlene Clark Hine. New York: Broadway Books, 1998.
- The Face of Our Past: Images of Black Women from Colonial America to the Present, with Hilary Mac Austin. Bloomington: Indiana University Press, 1999.
- Children of the Depression, with Hilary Mac Austin. Bloomington: Indiana University Press, 2000.
- America's Children: Repicturing Childhood from Exploration to the Present, with Hilary Mac Austin. New York: W. W. Norton, 2001.
- Black Women in America, second edition, edited by Darlene Clark Hine. Board of Senior Editors. New York: Oxford University Press, 2005.
