= Liberal paradox =

Paradox in social choice

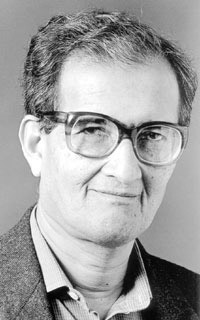
Amartya Sen, the creator of the liberal paradox

The liberal paradox, also Sen paradox or Sen's paradox, is a logical paradox proposed by Amartya Sen which shows that no means of aggregating individual preferences into a single, social choice, can simultaneously fulfill the following, seemingly mild conditions:

1. The unrestrictedness condition, or U: every possible ranking of each individual's preferences and all outcomes of every possible voting rule will be considered equally,
2. The Pareto condition, or P: if everybody individually likes some choice better at the same time, the society in its voting rule as a whole likes it better as well, and
3. Liberalism, or L (from which the theorem derives its gist): all individuals in a society must have at least one possibility of choosing differently, so that the social choice under a given voting rule changes as well. That is, as an individual liberal, anyone can exert their freedom of choice at least in some decision with tangible results.

Sen's result shows that this is impossible. The three, rather minimalistic, assumptions cannot all hold together. The paradox—more properly called a proof of contradiction, and a paradox only in the sense of informal logic—is contentious because it appears to contradict the classical liberal idea that markets are both Pareto-efficient and respect individual freedoms.

Sen's proof, set in the context of social choice theory, is similar in many respects to Arrow's impossibility theorem and the Gibbard–Satterthwaite theorem. As a mathematical construct, it also has much wider applicability: it is essentially about cyclical majorities between partially ordered sets, of which at least three must participate in order to give rise to the phenomenon. Since the idea is about pure mathematics and logic, similar arguments abound much further afield. They, for example, lead to the necessity of the fifth normal form in relational database design. The history of the argument also goes deeper, Condorcet's paradox perhaps being the first example of the finite sort.

== Pareto efficiency ==
=== Definition ===
A particular distribution of goods or outcome of any social process is regarded as Pareto-efficient if there is no way to improve one or more people's situations without harming another. Put another way, an outcome is not Pareto-efficient if there is a way to improve at least one person's situation without harming anyone else.

For example, suppose a mother has ten dollars which she intends to give to her two children Carlos and Shannon. Suppose the children each want only money, and they do not get jealous of one another. The following distributions are Pareto-efficient:

Carlos	Shannon
$5	$5
$10	$0
$2	$8

However, a distribution where the mother gives each of them $2 and wastes the remaining $6 is not Pareto-efficient, because she could have given the wasted money to either child and made that child better off without harming the other.

In this example, it was presumed that a child was made better or worse off by gaining or losing money, respectively, and that neither child gained or lost by evaluating her share in comparison to the other. To be more precise, we must evaluate all possible preferences that the child might have and consider a situation as Pareto-efficient if there is no other social state that at least one person favors (or prefers) and no one disfavors.

=== Use in economics ===
Pareto efficiency is often used in economics as a minimal sense of economic efficiency. If a mechanism does not result in Pareto-efficient outcomes, it is regarded as inefficient, since there was another outcome that could have made some people better off without harming anyone else.

The view that markets produce Pareto-efficient outcomes is regarded as an important and central justification for capitalism. This result was established (with certain assumptions) in an area of study known as general equilibrium theory and is known as the first fundamental theorem of welfare economics. As a result, these results often feature prominently in conservative libertarian justifications of unregulated markets.

== Two examples ==
=== Sen's original example ===
Sen's original example used a simple society with only two people and only one social issue to consider. The two members of society are named "Lewd" and "Prude". In this society there is a copy of Lady Chatterley's Lover and it must be given either to Lewd to read, to Prude to read, or disposed of - unread. Suppose that Lewd enjoys this sort of reading and would prefer to read it rather than have it disposed of. However, they would get even more enjoyment out of Prude being forced to read it.

Prude thinks that the book is indecent and that it should be disposed of, unread. However, if someone must read it, Prude would prefer to read it rather than Lewd since Prude thinks it would be even worse for someone to read and enjoy the book rather than read it in disgust.

Given these preferences of the two individuals in the society, a social planner must decide what to do. Should the planner force Lewd to read the book, force Prude to read the book or let it go unread? More particularly, the social planner must rank all three possible outcomes in terms of their social desirability. The social planner decides that they should be committed to individual rights, each individual should get to choose whether they, themself will read the book. Lewd should get to decide whether the outcome "Lewd reads" will be ranked higher than "No one reads", and similarly Prude should get to decide whether the outcome "Prude reads" will be ranked higher than "No one reads".

Following this strategy, the social planner declares that the outcome "Lewd reads" will be ranked higher than "No one reads" (because of Lewd's preferences) and that "No one reads" will be ranked higher than "Prude reads" (because of Prude's preferences). Consistency then requires that "Lewd reads" be ranked higher than "Prude reads", and so the social planner gives the book to Lewd to read.

Notice that this outcome is regarded as worse than "Prude reads" by both Prude and Lewd, and the chosen outcome is therefore Pareto inferior to another available outcome—the one where Prude is forced to read the book.

=== Gibbard's example ===
Another example was provided by philosopher Allan Gibbard. Suppose there are two individuals Alice and Bob who live next door to each other. Alice loves the color blue and hates red. Bob loves the color green and hates yellow. If each were free to choose the color of their house independently of the other, they would choose their favorite colors. But Alice hates Bob with a passion, and she would gladly endure a red house if it meant that Bob would have to endure his house being yellow. Bob similarly hates Alice, and would gladly endure a yellow house if that meant that Alice would live in a red house.

If each individual is free to choose their own house color, independently of the other, Alice would choose a blue house and Bob would choose a green one. But, this outcome is not Pareto efficient, because both Alice and Bob would prefer the outcome where Alice's house is red and Bob's is yellow. As a result, giving each individual the freedom to choose their own house color has led to an inefficient outcome—one that is inferior to another outcome where neither is free to choose their own color.

Mathematically, we can represent Alice's preferences with this symbol: $\succ_A$ and Bob's preferences with this one: $\succ_B$. We can represent each outcome as a pair: (Color of Alice's house, Color of Bob's house). As stated Alice's preferences are:

(Blue, Yellow) $\succ_A$ (Red, Yellow) $\succ_A$ (Blue, Green) $\succ_A$ (Red, Green)

And Bob's are:

(Red, Green) $\succ_B$ (Red, Yellow) $\succ_B$ (Blue, Green) $\succ_B$ (Blue, Yellow)

If we allow free and independent choices of both parties we end up with the outcome (Blue, Green) which is dispreferred by both parties to the outcome (Red, Yellow) and is therefore not Pareto efficient.

== The theorem ==
Suppose there is a society N consisting of two or more individuals and a set X of two or more social outcomes. (For example, in the Alice and Bob case, N consisted of Alice and Bob, and X consisted of the four color options ⟨Blue, Yellow⟩, ⟨Blue, Green⟩, ⟨Red, Yellow⟩, and ⟨Red, Green⟩.)

Suppose each individual in the society has a total and transitive preference relation on the set of social outcomes X. For notation, the preference relation of an individual i∊N is denoted by ≼_{i}. Each preference relation belongs to the set Rel(X) of all total and transitive relations on X.

A social choice function is a map which can take any configuration of preference relations of N as input and produce a subset of ("chosen") social outcomes as output. Formally, a social choice function is a map

$F : {Rel}(X)^N \rightarrow \mathcal{P}(X)$

from the set of functions between N→Rel(X), to the power set of X. (Intuitively, the social choice function represents a societal principle for choosing one or more social outcomes based on individuals' preferences. By representing the social choice process as a function on Rel(X)^{N}, we are tacitly assuming that the social choice function is defined for any possible configuration of preference relations; this is sometimes called the Universal Domain assumption.)

The liberal paradox states that every social choice function satisfies at most one of the following properties, never both:

1. Pareto optimality (collective efficiency): whenever all individuals of a society strictly prefer an outcome x over an outcome y, the choice function doesn't pick y.
  - Formally, a social choice function F is Pareto optimal if whenever p∊Rel(X)^{N} is a configuration of preference relations and there are two outcomes x and y such that x⪲_{i}y for every individual i∊N, then y∉ F(p).
  - Intuitively, Pareto optimality captures an aspect of collective efficiency: the social choice is made so that everyone is collectively as well off as possible, to the extent that every available tradeoff would make someone worse off.
2. Minimal liberalism (individual freedom): More than one individual in the society is decisive on a pair of social outcomes. (An individual is decisive on a pair of social outcomes x and y if, whenever they prefer x over y, the social choice function prefers x over y regardless of what other members of the society prefer. And similarly whenever they prefer y over x, the social choice function prefers y over x.)
  - Formally, a social choice function F respects minimal liberalism if there is more than one individual i∊N for which there exists a pair of outcomes x_{i}, y_{i} on which they are decisive—that is, for every configuration of preference relations p∊Rel(X)^{N}, y_{i}∊ F(p) only when x_{i}≼_{i}y_{i} (and similarly, x_{i}∊ F(p) only when y_{i}≼_{i}x_{i}).
  - As an example of decisiveness: in the Lewd/Prude case, Lewd was decisive on the pair of outcomes ⟨"Lewd reads", "No one reads"⟩ and Prude was decisive on the pair of outcomes ⟨"Prude reads", "No one reads"⟩.
  - Intuitively, minimal liberalism captures an aspect of individual freedom: for some issues, if you prefer x over y (or vice versa), then society respects your preference for x over y even if everyone else is against you. Sen's example is your personal preference for sleeping on your back or your side: on at least one innocuous personal area like this, a liberal society ought to prioritize your individual preference even if everyone else in society would prefer you to sleep another way. The formal requirement is that at least two people are decisive in this way, to rule out the possibility of a single person who dictates society's preferences.

In other words, the liberal paradox states that for every social choice function F, there is a configuration of preference relations p∊Rel(X)^{N} for which F violates either Pareto optimality or Minimal liberalism (or both). In the examples of Sen and Gibbard noted above, the social choice function satisfies minimal liberalism at the expense of Pareto optimality.

== Ways out of the paradox ==
Because the paradox relies on very few conditions, there are a limited number of ways to escape the paradox. Essentially one must either reject the universal domain assumption, the Pareto principle, or the minimal liberalism principle. Sen himself suggested two ways out, one a rejection of universal domain another a rejection of the Pareto principle.

=== Universal domain ===
Julian Blau proves that Sen's paradox can only arise when individuals have "nosy" preferences—that is when their preference depends not only on their own action but also on others' actions. In the example of Alice and Bob above, Alice has a preference over how Bob paints his house, and Bob has a preference over Alice's house color as well.

Most arguments which demonstrate market efficiency assume that individuals care about only their own consumption and not others' consumption and therefore do not consider the situations that give rise to Sen's paradox. In fact, this shows a strong relationship between Sen's paradox and the well known result that markets fail to produce Pareto outcomes in the presence of externalities. Externalities arise when the choices of one party affect another. Classic examples of externalities include pollution or overfishing. Because of their nosy preferences, Alice's choice imposes a negative externality on Bob and vice versa.

To prevent the paradox, Sen suggests that "The ultimate guarantee for individual liberty may rest not on rules for social choice but on developing individual values that respect each other's personal choices." Doing so would amount to limiting certain types of nosy preferences, or alternatively restricting the application of the Pareto principle only to those situations where individuals fail to have nosy preferences.

Note that if we consider the case of cardinal preferences—for instance, if Alice and Bob both had to state, within certain bounds, how much happiness they would get for each color of each house separately, and the situation which produced the most happiness were chosen—a minimally-liberal solution does not require that they have no nosiness at all, but just that the sum of all "nosy" preferences about one house's color are below some threshold, while the "non-nosy" preferences are all above that threshold. Since there are generally some questions for which this will be true—Sen's classic example is an individual's choice of whether to sleep on their back or their side—the goal of combining minimal liberalism with Pareto efficiency, while impossible to guarantee in all theoretical cases, may not in practice be impossible to obtain.

=== Pareto ===
Alternatively, one could remain committed to the universality of the rules for social choice and to individual rights and instead reject the universal application of the Pareto principle. Sen also hints that this should be how one escapes the paradox:

What is the moral? It is that in a very basic sense liberal values conflict with the Pareto principle. If someone takes the Pareto principle seriously, as economists seem to do, then he has to face problems of consistency in cherishing liberal values, even very mild ones. Or, to look at it in another way, if someone does have certain liberal values, then he may have to eschew his adherence to Pareto optimality. While the Pareto criterion has been thought to be an expression of individual liberty, it appears that in choices involving more than two alternatives it can have consequences that are, in fact, deeply illiberal.

=== Minimal liberalism ===
Most commentators on Sen's paradox have argued that Sen's minimal liberalism condition does not adequately capture the notion of individual rights. Essentially what is excluded from Sen's characterization of individual rights is the ability to voluntarily form contracts that lay down one's claim to a right.

For example, in the example of Lewd and Prude, although each has a right to refuse to read the book, Prude would voluntarily sign a contract with Lewd promising to read the book on condition that Lewd refrain from doing so. In such a circumstance there was no violation of Prude's or Lewd's rights because each entered the contract willingly. Similarly, Alice and Bob might sign a contract to each paint their houses their dispreferred color on condition that the other does the same.

In this vein, Gibbard provides a weaker version of the minimal liberalism claim which he argues is consistent with the possibility of contracts and which is also consistent with the Pareto principle given any possible preferences of the individuals.

=== Dynamism ===
Alternatively, instead of both Lewd and Prude deciding what to do at the same time, they should do it one after the other. If Prude decides not to read, then Lewd will decide to read. This yields the same outcome. However, if Prude decides to read, Lewd won't. "Prude reads" is preferred by Prude (and also Lewd) to "Lewd reads", so he will decide to read (with no obligation, voluntarily) to get this Pareto efficient outcome. Marc Masat hints that this should be another way out of the paradox:

If there's, at least, one player without dominant strategy, the game will be played sequentially where players with dominant strategy and need to change it (if they are in the Pareto optimal they don't have to) will be the firsts to choose, allowing to reach the Pareto Efficiency without dictatorship nor restricted domain and also avoiding contract's costs such as time, money or other people. If all players present a dominant strategy, contracts may be used.
