= Bayesian efficiency =

Analog of Pareto efficiency for situations with incomplete information

Bayesian efficiency is an analog of Pareto efficiency for situations in which there is incomplete information. Under Pareto efficiency, an allocation of a resource is Pareto efficient if there is no other allocation of that resource that makes no one worse off while making some agents strictly better off. A limitation with the concept of Pareto efficiency is that it assumes that knowledge about other market participants is available to all participants, in that every player knows the payoffs and strategies available to other players so as to have complete information. Often, the players have types that are hidden from the other player.

== Overview ==
The lack of complete information raises a question of when the efficiency calculation should be made. Should the efficiency check be made at the ex ante stage before the agent sees their types, at the interim stage after the agent sees their types, or at the ex post stage where the agent will have complete information about their types? Another issue is incentive. If a resource allocation rule is efficient but there is no incentive to abide by that rule or accept that rule, then the revelation principle asserts that there is no mechanism by which this allocation rule can be realized.

Bayesian efficiency overcomes problems of the Pareto efficiency by accounting for incomplete information, by addressing the timing of the evaluation (ex ante efficient, interim efficient, or ex post efficient), and by adding an incentive qualifier so that the allocation rule is incentive compatible.

Bayesian efficiency separately defines three types of efficiency: ex ante, interim, and ex post. For an allocation rule $x:T\to A$:

Ex ante efficiency: $x$ is incentive compatible, and there exists no incentive compatible allocation rule $y:T\to A$ that

$$\int U^i(y(t),t)dG^i(t) \geq \int U^i(x(t),t)dG^i(t)$$

for all $i$, with strict inequality for some $i$.

Interim efficiency: $x$ is incentive compatible, and there exists no incentive compatible allocation rule $y:T\to A$ that

$$\int U^i(y(t),t)dG^i(t_{-i}|t_i) \geq \int U^i(x(t),t)dG^i(t_{-i}|t_i)$$

for all $i$ and $t_i$, with strict inequality for some $i$ and $t_i$.

Ex post efficiency: $x$ is incentive compatible, and there exists no incentive compatible allocation rule $y:T\to A$ that

$$U^i(y(t),t) \geq U^i(x(t),t)$$

for all $i$, with strict inequality for some $i$.

Here, $G^i$ are beliefs, $U^i$ are utility functions, and $i$ are agents. An ex ante efficient allocation is always interim and ex post efficient, and an interim efficient allocation is always ex post efficient.
