= Selma Mushkin =

American health economist (1913–1979)

Selma J. Mushkin (December 31, 1913 – December 2, 1979) was an American health economist and educator. She worked for the U.S. federal government and also spent 17 years teaching at three different academic institutions.

== Early life and education ==
Mushkin was born in 1913 in Centerville, New Jersey. She earned a B.A. from Brooklyn College in 1934, an M.A. from Columbia University in 1935, and a PhD from the New School for Social Research in 1956.

== Career ==
Mushkin moved from New York to Washington, D.C., in 1937, as the chief of financial studies in the federal government's Social Security Administration. She moved to the U.S. Public Health Service as an economist in 1949 and remained in that role until 1960. In 1960, she took up a position in the Office of Education. From 1968 to 1970, she worked at the Urban Institute think tank. She was an economic advisor to the U.S. Advisory Commission on Intergovernmental Relations, the Office of Management and Budget, and the international Organisation for Economic Co-operation and Development.

Mushkin also held teaching positions at three different universities: Johns Hopkins University (1952–53), George Washington University (1963–68), and Georgetown University (1970–79). She was a proponent of the idea that improvement in healthcare was equally important as improvement in education in order to increase economic growth. In 1971, she co-authored a notable report estimating that 30–50% of D.C. children living in poverty could be affected by lead poisoning, prompting the search for non-lead-based paints. Another of her notable reports suggested that 20% of national healthcare costs were spent on terminally ill patients.

She was a fellow of the Woodrow Wilson International Center for Scholars and the American Public Health Association, and she was elected to the National Academy of Medicine in 1974.

== Death ==
Mushkin died from cancer in Washington in 1979. A collection of her papers is held by the Georgetown University Library.

== Bibliography ==
- Cicarelli, James; Cicarelli, Julianne (2003). Distinguished Women Economists. Greenwood Press. ISBN 9780313303319.
