= Pareto efficiency =

Weakly optimal allocation of resources

In welfare economics, a Pareto improvement formalizes the idea of an outcome being "better in every possible way". A change is called a Pareto improvement if it leaves at least one person in society better off without leaving anyone else worse off than they were before. A situation is called Pareto efficient or Pareto optimal if all possible Pareto improvements have already been made; in other words, there are no longer any ways left to make one person better off without making some other person worse off.

In social choice theory, the same concept is sometimes called the unanimity principle, which says that if everyone in a society (non-strictly) prefers A to B, society as a whole also non-strictly prefers A to B. The Pareto frontier consists of all Pareto-efficient situations.

In addition to the context of efficiency in allocation, the concept of Pareto efficiency also arises in the context of efficiency in production vs. x-inefficiency: a set of outputs of goods is Pareto efficient if there is no feasible re-allocation of productive inputs such that output of one product increases while the outputs of all other goods either increase or remain the same.

Besides economics, the notion of Pareto efficiency has also been applied to selecting alternatives in engineering and biology. Each option is first assessed, under multiple criteria, and then a subset of options is identified with the property that no other option can categorically outperform the specified option. It is a statement of impossibility of improving one variable without harming other variables in the subject of multi-objective optimization (also termed Pareto optimization).

Some economists consider the Pareto efficiency principle as "the only feasible route to peace and prosperity".

== History ==
The concept is named after Vilfredo Pareto (1848–1923), an Italian civil engineer and economist, who used the concept in his studies of economic efficiency and income distribution.

Pareto originally used the word "optimal" for the concept, but this is somewhat of a misnomer: Pareto's concept more closely aligns with an idea of "efficiency", because it does not identify a single "best" (optimal) outcome. Instead, it only identifies a set of outcomes that might be considered optimal, by at least one person.

== Overview ==
Formally, a state is Pareto optimal if there is no alternative state where at least one participant's well-being is higher, and nobody else's well-being is lower. If there is a state change that satisfies this condition, the new state is called a "Pareto improvement". When no Pareto improvements are possible, the state is a "Pareto optimum".

In other words, Pareto efficiency is when it is impossible to make one party better off without making another party worse off. This state indicates that resources can no longer be allocated in a way that makes one party better off without harming other parties. In a state of Pareto efficiency, resources are allocated in the most efficient way possible.

In terms of game theory, a strategy profile s is Pareto efficient when there is no other strategy profile s′ such that u_{i}(s′) ≥ u_{i}(s) for every player i and u_{j}(s′) > u_{j}(s) for some player j. In this equation, u represents the utility or benefit and j represents the player.

Efficiency is an important criterion for judging behavior in a game. In zero-sum games, every outcome is Pareto efficient.

A special case of a state is an allocation of resources. The formal presentation of the concept in an economy is the following: Consider an economy with $n$ agents and $k$ goods. Then an allocation $\{x_1, \dots, x_n\}$, where $x_i \in \mathbb{R}^k$ for all i, is Pareto optimal if there is no other feasible allocation $\{x_1', \dots, x_n'\}$ where, for utility function $u_i$ for each agent $i$, $u_i(x_i') \geq u_i(x_i)$ for all $i \in \{1, \dots, n\}$ with $u_i(x_i') > u_i(x_i)$ for some $i$. Here, in this simple economy, "feasibility" refers to an allocation where the total amount of each good that is allocated sums to no more than the total amount of the good in the economy. In a more complex economy with production, an allocation would consist both of consumption vectors and production vectors, and feasibility would require that the total amount of each consumed good is no greater than the initial endowment plus the amount produced.

Under the assumptions of the first welfare theorem, a competitive market leads to a Pareto-efficient outcome. This result was first demonstrated mathematically by economists Kenneth Arrow and Gérard Debreu. However, the result only holds under the assumptions of the theorem: markets exist for all possible goods, there are no externalities, markets are perfectly competitive, and market participants have perfect information.

In the absence of perfect information or complete markets, outcomes will generally be Pareto inefficient, per the Greenwald–Stiglitz theorem.

The second welfare theorem is essentially the reverse of the first welfare theorem. It states that under similar, ideal assumptions, any Pareto optimum can be obtained by some competitive equilibrium, or free market system, although it may also require a lump-sum transfer of wealth.

== Pareto order ==
If multiple sub-goals $f_i$ (with $i \ge 1$) exist, combined into a vector-valued objective function $\vec{f}=(f_1, \dots f_n)^T$, generally, finding a unique optimum $\vec{x}^*$ becomes challenging. This is due to the absence of a total order relation for $n >1$ which would not always prioritize one target over another target (like the lexicographical order). In the multi-objective optimization setting, various solutions can be incomparable as there is no total order relation to facilitate the comparison $\vec{f}(\vec{x}^*) \geq \vec{f}(\vec{x})$. Only the Pareto order is applicable:

Consider a vector-valued minimization problem: $\vec{y}^{(1)} \in \mathbb{R}^m$ Pareto dominates $\vec{y}^{(2)} \in \mathbb{R}^m$ if and only if: $\forall i \in \{1,\dots m\}:\vec{y}_i^{(1)} \leq \vec{y}_i^{(2)}$ and $\exists j \in \{1,\dots m\}:\vec{y}_j^{(1)} < \vec{y}_j^{(2)}.$ We then write $\vec{y}^{(1)} \prec \vec{y}^{(2)}$, where $\prec$ is the Pareto order. This means that $\vec{y}^{(1)}$ is not worse than $\vec{y}^{(2)}$ in any goal but is better (since smaller) in at least one goal $j$. The Pareto order is a strict partial order, though it is not a product order (neither non-strict nor strict).

If $\vec{f}(\vec{x}_1) \prec \vec{f}(\vec{x}_2)$, then this defines a preorder in the search space and we say $\vec{x}_1$ Pareto dominates the alternative $\vec{x}_2$ and we write $\vec{x}_1 \prec_{\vec{f}} \vec{x}_2$.

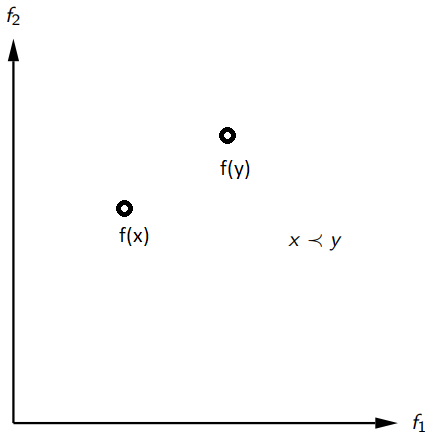
$\vec{f}(x)$ dominates $\vec{f}(y)$ in the Pareto order (which seeks to minimize the goals $f_1$ and $f_2$).

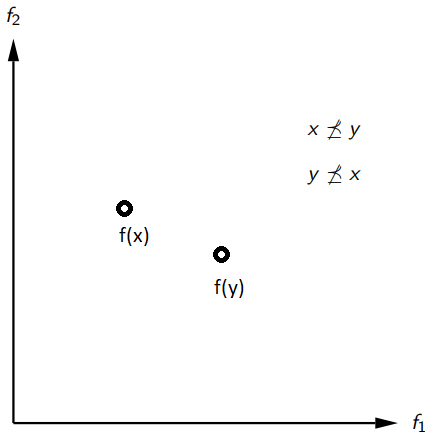
$\vec{f}(x)$ does not dominate $\vec{f}(y)$ in the Pareto order and $\vec{f}(y)$ does not dominate $\vec{f}(x)$ in the Pareto order (which seeks to minimize the goals $f_1$ and $f_2$).

== Variants ==
=== Weak Pareto efficiency ===
Weak Pareto efficiency is a situation that cannot be strictly improved for every individual.

Formally, a strong Pareto improvement is defined as a situation in which all agents are strictly better off (in contrast to just "Pareto improvement", which requires that one agent is strictly better off and the other agents are at least as good). A situation is weak Pareto efficient if it has no strong Pareto improvements.

Any strong Pareto improvement is also a weak Pareto improvement. The opposite is not true; for example, consider a resource allocation problem with two resources, which Alice values at {10, 0}, and George values at {5, 5}. Consider the allocation giving all resources to Alice, where the utility profile is (10, 0):

- It is a weak PO, since no other allocation is strictly better to both agents (there are no strong Pareto improvements).
- But it is not a strong PO, since the allocation in which George gets the second resource is strictly better for George and weakly better for Alice (it is a weak Pareto improvement) – its utility profile is (10, 5).

A market does not require local nonsatiation to get to a weak Pareto optimum.

=== Constrained Pareto efficiency ===
Constrained Pareto efficiency is a weakening of Pareto optimality, accounting for the fact that a potential planner (e.g., the government) may not be able to improve upon a decentralized market outcome, even if that outcome is inefficient. This will occur if it is limited by the same informational or institutional constraints as are individual agents.

An example is of a setting where individuals have private information (for example, a labor market where the worker's own productivity is known to the worker but not to a potential employer, or a used-car market where the quality of a car is known to the seller but not to the buyer) which results in moral hazard or an adverse selection and a sub-optimal outcome. In such a case, a planner who wishes to improve the situation is unlikely to have access to any information that the participants in the markets do not have. Hence, the planner cannot implement allocation rules which are based on the idiosyncratic characteristics of individuals; for example, "if a person is of type A, they pay price p_{1}, but if of type B, they pay price p_{2}" (see Lindahl prices). Essentially, only anonymous rules are allowed (of the sort "Everyone pays price p") or rules based on observable behavior; "if any person chooses x at price p_{x}, then they get a subsidy of ten dollars, and nothing otherwise". If there exists no allowed rule that can successfully improve upon the market outcome, then that outcome is said to be "constrained Pareto optimal".

=== Fractional Pareto efficiency ===
Fractional Pareto efficiency is a strengthening of Pareto efficiency in the context of fair item allocation. An allocation of indivisible items is fractionally Pareto efficient ('fPE or fPO) if it is not Pareto dominated even by an allocation in which some items are split between agents. This is in contrast to standard Pareto efficiency, which only considers domination by feasible (discrete) allocations.

As an example, consider an item allocation problem with two items, which Alice values at {3, 2} and George values at {4, 1}. Consider the allocation giving the first item to Alice and the second to George, where the utility profile is (3, 1):

- It is Pareto efficient, since any other discrete allocation (without splitting items) makes someone worse off.
- However, it is not fractionally Pareto efficient, since it is Pareto-dominated by the allocation giving to Alice half of the first item and the whole second item, and the other half of the first item to George – its utility profile is (3.5, 2).

=== Ex-ante Pareto efficiency ===
When the decision process is random, such as in fair random assignment or random social choice or fractional approval voting, there is a difference between ex-post and ex-ante Pareto efficiency:

- Ex-post Pareto efficiency means that any outcome of the random process is Pareto efficient.
- Ex-ante Pareto efficiency means that the lottery determined by the process is Pareto efficient with respect to the expected utilities. That is: no other lottery gives a higher expected utility to one agent and at least as high expected utility to all agents.

If some lottery L is ex-ante PE, then it is also ex-post PE. Proof: suppose that one of the ex-post outcomes x of L is Pareto dominated by some other outcome y. Then, by moving some probability mass from x to y, one attains another lottery L′ that ex-ante Pareto-dominates L.

The opposite is not true: ex-ante PE is stronger that ex-post PE. For example, suppose there are two objects – a car and a house. Alice values the car at 2 and the house at 3; George values the car at 2 and the house at 9. Consider the following two lotteries:

1. With probability 1/2, give car to Alice and house to George; otherwise, give car to George and house to Alice. The expected utility is 2/2 + 3/2 = 2.5 for Alice and 2/2 + 9/2 = 5.5 for George. Both allocations are ex-post PE, since the one who got the car cannot be made better off without harming the one who got the house.
2. With probability 1, give car to Alice, then with probability 1/3 give the house to Alice, otherwise give it to George. The expected utility is 2 + 3/3 = 3 for Alice and 9 × 2/3 = 6 for George. Again, both allocations are ex-post PE.

While both lotteries are ex-post PE, the lottery 1 is not ex-ante PE, since it is Pareto dominated by lottery 2.

Another example involves dichotomous preferences. There are 5 possible outcomes (a, b, c, d, e) and 6 voters. The voters' approval sets are (ac, ad, ae, bc, bd, be). All five outcomes are PE, so every lottery is ex-post PE. But the lottery selecting c, d, e with probability 1/3 each is not ex-ante PE, since it gives an expected utility of 1/3 to each voter, while the lottery selecting a, b with probability 1/2 each gives an expected utility of 1/2 to each voter.

=== Bayesian Pareto efficiency ===
Bayesian efficiency is an adaptation of Pareto efficiency to settings in which players have incomplete information regarding the types of other players.

=== Ordinal Pareto efficiency ===
Ordinal Pareto efficiency is an adaptation of Pareto efficiency to settings in which players report only rankings on individual items, and we do not know for sure how they rank entire bundles.

=== Location Pareto efficiency ===
In location theory, concepts similar to Pareto efficiency are defined for points in the plane. Given a set A of input points, an allocation is efficient if no other point is nearer to some points in A and at least as near to all points in A. These concepts are motivated by considering each point in A as representing the location of an agent, and the points x and y are potential locations for a facility. Each agent prefers the facility to be as near as possible to his own location. With this interpretation, efficiency corresponds to Pareto-efficiency.

== Pareto efficiency and equity ==
Although an outcome may be a Pareto improvement, this does not imply that the outcome is equitable. It is possible that inequality persists even after a Pareto improvement. Despite the fact that it is frequently used in conjunction with the idea of Pareto optimality, the term "efficiency" refers to the process of increasing societal productivity. It is possible for a society to have Pareto efficiency while also have high levels of inequality. Consider the following scenario: there is a pie and three persons; the most equitable way would be to divide the pie into three equal portions. However, if the pie is divided in half and shared between two people, it is considered Pareto efficient – meaning that the third person does not lose out (despite the fact that he does not receive a piece of the pie). When making judgments, it is critical to consider a variety of aspects, including social efficiency, overall welfare, and issues such as diminishing marginal value.

== Pareto efficiency and market failure ==
In order to fully understand market failure, one must first comprehend market success, which is defined as the ability of a set of idealized competitive markets to achieve an equilibrium allocation of resources that is Pareto optimal in terms of resource allocation. According to the definition of market failure, it is a circumstance in which the conclusion of the first fundamental theorem of welfare is erroneous; that is, when the allocations made through markets are not efficient. In a free market, market failure is defined as an inefficient allocation of resources. Due to the fact that it is feasible to improve, market failure implies Pareto inefficiency. For example, excessive consumption of depreciating items (drugs/tobacco) results in external costs to non-smokers, as well as premature death for smokers who do not quit. An increase in the price of cigarettes could motivate people to quit smoking while also raising funds for the treatment of smoking-related ailments.

=== Approximate Pareto efficiency ===
Given some ε > 0, an outcome is called ε-Pareto efficient if no other outcome gives all agents at least the same utility, and one agent a utility at least (1 + ε) higher. This captures the notion that improvements smaller than (1 + ε) are negligible and should not be considered a breach of efficiency.

== Pareto efficiency and welfare-maximization ==
Suppose each agent i is assigned a positive weight a_{i}. For every allocation x, define the welfare of x as the weighted sum of utilities of all agents in x:

$$W_a(x) := \sum_{i=1}^n a_i u_i(x).$$

Let x_{a} be an allocation that maximizes the welfare over all allocations:

$$x_a \in \arg\max_x W_a(x).$$

It is easy to show that the allocation x_{a} is Pareto efficient: since all weights are positive, any Pareto improvement would increase the sum, contradicting the definition of x_{a}.

Japanese neo-Walrasian economist Takashi Negishi proved that, under certain assumptions, the opposite is also true: for every Pareto-efficient allocation x, there exists a positive vector a such that x maximizes W_{a}. A shorter proof is provided by Hal Varian.

== Use in engineering ==
The notion of Pareto efficiency has been used in engineering. Given a set of choices and a way of valuing them, the Pareto frontier (or Pareto set or Pareto front) is the set of choices that are Pareto efficient. By restricting attention to the set of choices that are Pareto efficient, a designer can make trade-offs within this set, rather than considering the full range of every parameter.

== Use in public policy ==
Modern microeconomic theory has drawn heavily upon the concept of Pareto efficiency for inspiration. Pareto and his successors have tended to describe this technical definition of optimal resource allocation in the context of it being an equilibrium that can theoretically be achieved within an abstract model of market competition. It has therefore very often been treated as a corroboration of Adam Smith's "invisible hand" notion. More specifically, it motivated the debate over "market socialism" in the 1930s.

However, because the Pareto-efficient outcome is difficult to assess in the real world when issues including asymmetric information, signalling, adverse selection, and moral hazard are introduced, most people do not take the theorems of welfare economics as accurate descriptions of the real world. Therefore, the significance of the two welfare theorems of economics is in their ability to generate a framework that has dominated neoclassical thinking about public policy. That framework is that the welfare economics theorems allow the political economy to be studied in the following two situations: "market failure" and "the problem of redistribution".

Analysis of "market failure" can be understood by the literature surrounding externalities. When comparing the "real" economy to the complete contingent markets economy (which is considered efficient), the inefficiencies become clear. These inefficiencies, or externalities, are then able to be addressed by mechanisms, including property rights and corrective taxes.

Analysis of "the problem with redistribution" deals with the observed political question of how income or commodity taxes should be utilized. The theorem tells us that no taxation is Pareto efficient and that taxation with redistribution is Pareto inefficient. Because of this, most of the literature is focused on finding solutions where given there is a tax structure, how can the tax structure prescribe a situation where no person could be made better off by a change in available taxes.

== Use in biology ==
Pareto optimisation has also been studied in biological processes. In bacteria, genes were shown to be either inexpensive to make (resource-efficient) or easier to read (translation-efficient). Natural selection acts to push highly expressed genes towards the Pareto frontier for resource use and translational efficiency. Genes near the Pareto frontier were also shown to evolve more slowly (indicating that they are providing a selective advantage).

== Common misconceptions ==
It would be incorrect to treat Pareto efficiency as equivalent to societal optimization, as the latter is a normative concept, which is a matter of interpretation that typically would account for the consequence of degrees of inequality of distribution. An example would be the interpretation of one school district with low property tax revenue versus another with much higher revenue as a sign that more equal distribution occurs with the help of government redistribution.

== Criticism ==
Some commentators contest that Pareto efficiency could potentially serve as an ideological tool. With it implying that capitalism is self-regulated thereof, it is likely that the embedded structural problems such as unemployment would be treated as deviating from the equilibrium or norm, and thus neglected or discounted.

Pareto efficiency does not require a totally equitable distribution of wealth, which is another aspect that draws in criticism. An economy in which a wealthy few hold the vast majority of resources can be Pareto efficient. A simple example is the distribution of a pie among three people. The most equitable distribution would assign one third to each person. However, the assignment of, say, a half section to each of two individuals and none to the third is also Pareto optimal despite not being equitable, because none of the recipients could be made better off without decreasing someone else's share; and there are many other such distribution examples. An example of a Pareto-inefficient distribution of the pie would be allocation of a quarter of the pie to each of the three, with the remainder discarded.

The liberal paradox elaborated by Amartya Sen shows that when people have preferences about what other people do, the goal of Pareto efficiency can come into conflict with the goal of individual liberty.

Lastly, it is proposed that Pareto efficiency to some extent inhibited discussion of other possible criteria of efficiency. As Wharton School professor Ben Lockwood argues, one possible reason is that any other efficiency criteria established in the neoclassical domain will reduce to Pareto efficiency at the end.

== See also ==
- Admissible decision rule, analog in decision theory
- Arrow's impossibility theorem
- Bayesian efficiency
- Fundamental theorems of welfare economics
- Deadweight loss
- Economic efficiency
- Highest and best use
- Kaldor–Hicks efficiency
- Marginal utility
- Market failure, when a market result is not Pareto optimal
- Maximal element, concept in order theory
- Maxima of a point set
- Multi-objective optimization
- Nash equilibrium
- Pareto-efficient envy-free division
- Proctor optimum water content
- Social Choice and Individual Values by Kenneth Arrow
- Stable marriage problem
- Trade-off talking rational economic person (TOTREP)
- Welfare economics
