= Kaldor–Hicks efficiency =

State leading to a Pareto-efficient outcome, concerning the compensation principle

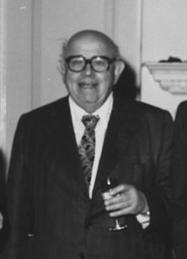
Nicholas Kaldor

A Kaldor–Hicks improvement is an economic re-allocation of resources among people that captures some of the intuitive appeal of a Pareto improvement, but has less stringent criteria and is hence applicable to more circumstances. A re-allocation is a Kaldor–Hicks improvement if those that are made better off could hypothetically compensate those that are made worse off and lead to a Pareto-improving outcome. The compensation does not actually have to occur (there is no presumption in favor of status-quo) and thus, a Kaldor–Hicks improvement can in fact leave some people worse off.

== Terminology ==
A situation is said to be Kaldor–Hicks efficient, or equivalently is said to satisfy the Kaldor–Hicks criterion, if no potential Kaldor–Hicks improvement from that situation exists. If an outcome is the highest it could possibly be, it is called a Hicks-optimal outcome. A Hicks optimal outcome is always Pareto efficient.

The phenomenon is named for twentieth-century economists Nicholas Kaldor and John Hicks.

== Explanation ==
=== Pareto ===
A reallocation is a Pareto improvement if at least one person is made better off and nobody is made worse off. However, in practice, it is almost impossible to take any social action, such as a change in economic policy, without making at least one person worse off. Even voluntary exchanges may not be Pareto improving if they make third parties worse off.

Using the criterion for Kaldor–Hicks improvement, an outcome is an improvement if those that are made better off could in principle compensate those that are made worse off, so that a Pareto improving outcome could (but does not have to) be achieved. For example, a voluntary exchange that creates pollution would be a Kaldor–Hicks improvement if the buyers and sellers are still willing to carry out the transaction even if they have the intention to fully compensate the victims of the pollution(which is unlikely to occur). Kaldor–Hicks does not require compensation actually be paid, merely that the possibility for compensation exists, and thus need not leave each at least as well off. Under Kaldor–Hicks efficiency, an improvement can in fact leave some people worse off. Pareto-improvements require making every party involved better off (or at least none worse off).

While every Pareto improvement is a Kaldor–Hicks improvement, most Kaldor–Hicks improvements are not Pareto improvements. In other words, the set of Pareto improvements is a proper subset of Kaldor–Hicks improvements.

=== Kaldor and Hicks ===
The Kaldor criterion holds that an activity moves the economy closer to Pareto optimality if the maximum amount the gainers are prepared to pay to the losers to agree to the change is greater than the minimum amount losers are prepared to accept.

John Hicks claims that adherence to the criterion moves the economy toward Pareto optimality if the maximum amount the losers would pay the gainers to forgo the change is less than the minimum amount the gainers would accept to so agree.

Thus, the Kaldor test supposes that losers could prevent the arrangement and asks whether gainers value their gain so much they would and could pay losers to accept the arrangement, whereas the Hicks test supposes that gainers are able to proceed with the change and asks whether losers consider their loss to be worth less than what it would cost them to pay gainers to agree not to proceed with the change. After several technical problems with each separate criterion were discovered, they were combined into the Scitovsky criterion, more commonly known as the Kaldor–Hicks criterion, which does not share those flaws.

== Use in policy-making ==
Kaldor–Hicks methods are typically used as tests of proposed changes rather than as intrinsic efficiency goals. They are used to determine whether an activity moves the economy toward Pareto efficiency. Any change usually makes some people better off and others worse off, so these tests consider what would happen if gainers were to compensate losers.

The Kaldor–Hicks criterion is widely applied in game theory's non-zero sum games, such as DOTMLPF, welfare economics, and managerial economics. For example, it forms an underlying rationale for cost–benefit analysis. In cost–benefit analysis, a project (for example, a new airport) is evaluated by comparing the total costs, such as building costs and environmental costs, with the total benefits, such as airline profits and convenience for travelers. (However, as cost–benefit analysis may also assign different social welfare weights to different individuals, e.g. more to the poor, the compensation criterion is not always invoked by cost–benefit analysis.)

The project would typically be given the go-ahead if the benefits exceed the costs. This is effectively an application of the Kaldor–Hicks criterion because it is equivalent to requiring that the benefits be enough that those that benefit could in theory compensate those that have lost out. The criterion is used because it is argued that it is justifiable for society as a whole to make some worse off if this means a greater gain for others.

== Criticisms ==
Perhaps the most common criticism of the Kaldor-Hicks criteria is that it is unclear why the ability of the winners to compensate the losers should matter, or have moral or political significance as a decision criterion, if the compensation is not actually paid.

At a more technical level, various versions of the Kaldor–Hicks criteria lack desirable formal properties. For instance, Tibor Scitovsky demonstrated that the Kaldor criterion alone is not antisymmetric: it's possible to have a situation where an outcome A is an improvement (according to the Kaldor criterion) over outcome B, but B is also an improvement over A. The combined Kaldor–Hicks criterion does not have this problem, but it may not be transitive (given A as an improvement over B, and B over C, A is not thereby an improvement over C).

== See also ==
- Compensation principle
- Pareto efficiency
- Scitovsky paradox
