= Distributive efficiency =

In welfare economics, distributive efficiency occurs when goods and services are received by those who have the greatest need for them. Abba Lerner first proposed the idea of distributive efficiency in his 1944 book The Economics of Control.

== The law of diminishing marginal utility ==
The concept of distributive efficiency is based on the law of diminishing marginal utility. According to this economic law, as a person gets more to spend, things will be bought that give less and less utility. For example, if a person is given a gift certificate for a music download (and has no way to resell the certificate), the gift certificate will be used to purchase the song that will be enjoyed the most. If another certificate is given, the second favorite song will be bought. The process continues as long as the person keeps getting certificates for downloads. Each additional song the person buys is slightly less desirable than the one before.

== Diminishing utility and society ==
Lerner applied the concept of utility and its associated "law of marginal utility" to the distribution of income in society. The law of diminishing marginal utility implies that poorer people will gain more utility from money for additional spending than the wealthy. For instance, if a homeless family is given a gift certificate for a house, they will be able to use it to provide shelter for themselves. If a very rich person is given such a gift, he may spend it on a vacation residence which he will only use a few weeks of the year.

As such, aggregated utility would be maximized by taking wealth from the rich and giving it to the poor, and the state of optimized utility would be perfect economic equality. As Lerner puts it, "If it is desired to maximize the total satisfaction of a society, the rational procedure is to divide income on an equalitarian basis" (Lerner, 32). In other words, if we are given a fixed amount of wealth and a group of people to distribute it to, we can maximize total happiness by dividing the wealth equally between the members of that group.

However, in real situations the total amount of wealth is not fixed, and it has been argued that too much redistribution of income can reduce this total amount by lowering incentives for economic growth and development. Knowing this, Lerner qualified his earlier statement: "The principle of equality would have to compromise with the principle of providing such incentives as would increase the total of income available to be divided” (Lerner, 36). In this view, a balance must be reached between equality and incentives.

== Criticisms of utility's relevance ==
Different value systems have different perspectives on the use of utility in making moral judgments. Deontological views of morality focus on factors other than utility. Also, many Marxists, Kantians, and certain libertarians (such as Robert Nozick), all believe utility to be irrelevant as a moral standard or at least not as important as others such as natural rights.
