= Andra Medea =

American writer

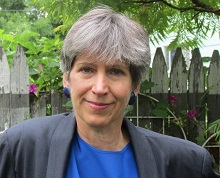
- Born: September 17, 1953 (age 72); Chicago, Illinois, US
- Occupations: Project developer in de-escalation and crisis prevention; writer
- Writing career
- Subjects: De-escalation skills, violence prevention & conflict theory
- Notable works: Against Rape (1974), Conflict Unraveled (2004), Safe Within These Walls (2013).
- Website: www.conflictunraveled.com

Andra Medea (born 1953) is an American writer and a project developer and theorist on issues of conflict and violence, specifically crisis prevention. She first came to prominence in 1974 when, with writer Kathleen Thompson, she wrote Against Rape (Farrar, Straus, 1974), the book that broke the silence on rape internationally. She later founded Chimera, Inc., which for more than twenty years taught self-defense classes for women based on Medea's early theories of conflict. In the early 2000s, she developed Medea's Conflict Continuum, which she built upon in two books, "Conflict Unraveled" (Pivot Point Press, 2005) and "Going Home Without Going Crazy" (New Harbinger, 2006) and a number of courses, both online and on video, for veterans, lawyers, judges, psychiatric staff and others. Her video "Working with Emotional Clients: The Virtual Tranquilizer for Lawyers" (American Bar Association, 2010) has been a best-selling continuing education program for the ABA. More recently, she developed this work on the continuum even further in "Safe Within These Walls: De-escalating School Situations Before They Become Crises" (Capstone, 2013).

== Early life and activism ==
Medea was the daughter of a Lithuanian American machinist, Edward Thomas, and his wife, Emily, who was a homemaker and community activist. While she was growing up in Chicago's Marquette Park, the neighborhood was a racial battleground, and Medea learned her first techniques for dealing with conflict on the street. She was profoundly affected by her mother's activism. Emily Thomas helped found the Southwest Committee on Peaceful Equality, aimed at fighting prejudice by encouraging dialogue between races, and was one of the founders of Southwest Women Working Together, organized to address the needs of women of all races and ethnicities on the Southwest Side. Medea followed in her mother's footsteps. In 1966. Dr. Martin Luther King led two open housing marches in Marquette Park, which were met by white mobs who attacked the marchers and burned cars. Dr. King was hit in the head with a rock and later stated, "I have never in my life seen such hate. Not in Mississippi or Alabama. This is a terrible thing." During King's Chicago campaign, Medea went to King's west side headquarters, where she first met civil rights leaders. During this time, the American Nazi Party (formally, the National Socialist Party of America), at that time headed by Frank Collin, established its headquarters on 71st St., two blocks from Medea's home. She and a small group of friends took it upon themselves to "vandalize" the party's racist billboards. In April 1972, Medea organized, at the Chicago Loop Young Women's Christian Association (YWCA), the first conference in the Midwest on the subject of rape. Out of that conference came the organization Chicago Women Against Rape, of which Medea was one of the founders, and the book Against Rape, which Medea wrote with Kathleen Thompson.

== Against rape ==
Against Rape was published in 1974, going through seven printings before its official publication date. It was serialized in hundreds of newspapers around the country and remained in print for eighteen years. It was a time when women across the country were coming to terms with the issue. Organizations similar to Chicago Women Against Rape were formed in other large cities and small towns. Women created and staffed rape crisis hotlines and worked to reform treatment of women in hospitals, by police and by courts. Other important books on the subject were published, including, Rape: A First Sourcebook for Women by the New York Radical Feminists (New American Library, 1974). In 1975, Susan Brownmiller's Against Our Will added a profound historical element to the discussion. In Against Rape, Medea's groundbreaking self-defense methods were first developed and published. Not long after its publication, Medea founded Chimera: Self-Defense for Women.

== Chimera, Inc. ==
This innovative form of self-defense combined street fighting, some martial arts techniques, and a great deal of non-physical strategy that pre-figured Medea's conflict resolution theories. That strategy was based on both her street fighting experiences and her martial arts training. Medea's focus on analyzing a conflict situation has remained at the forefront of her work throughout her career. As she later said in an interview in the Chicago Reader, "The basic mentality behind Chimera is you think and you keep thinking and you do not let someone psych you out. You need physical skills, but your brain is the most important thing you have." Against Rape was the primary text for the self-defense courses of Chimera, Inc., for more than a decade. The Chimera program expanded to six states and trained upwards of 50,000 students.

== Medea's conflict continuum ==
Medea's Conflict Continuum has been the basis of all her conflict management work. She developed it while teaching courses using this theoretical model as a lecturer at Northwestern University and DePaul University and an instructor at the University of Chicago. According to Medea, forms of human conflict can be analyzed with the Continuum and then approached in a way that is appropriate to the level on which the conflict is taking place, thereby increasing the probability that it can be resolved. The analysis applies to conflicts that vary as greatly as parent-teacher conferences and international border disputes. Medea delineates four levels of conflict, all characterized by specific behaviors and likely outcomes. The first three are treated in her books. They also inform her work with a variety of government agencies and professional organizations. For example, in 2009, she was called to testify on learned helplessness and barriers to ethical behavior before the Illinois Reform Commission in the wake of the Rod Blagoyevich scandal. In 2010, she spoke at the First Annual Illinois Administrative Law Conference on the physiology of stress in the courtroom. Although much of her work has been with attorneys and judges, she has also used her model in work with returning veterans, psychiatric staff and others. In 1987, she established Medea and Associates, of which she is president.

== Safe Within These Walls ==
As conflict in schools increased in recent years, Medea turned her attention to practical techniques to de-escalate aggression and prevent crises. The book has been well received by teachers, administrators, and school counselors. Education World describes the book this way: "Bottom Line: If you're looking to deal with sensitive classroom situations, such as ones involving students with behavioral and developmental issues, and ones that risk becoming heated and/or violent, this book is the perfect resource." In addition to Safe Within These Walls, Medea does professional development presentations and workshops about crisis prevention in the schools.

== Books ==
Against Rape, with Kathleen Thompson. New York: Farrar, Straus & Giroux, 1974. The Intelligent Woman's (Every Woman's) Guide to Self-Defense. Chicago: Chimera, Inc., 1976. Conflict Unraveled. Chicago: Pivot Point Press, 2004. Going Home Without Going Crazy. Oakland: New Harbinger Publications, 2006. Safe Within These Walls. North Mankato, MN : Capstone Professional, 2013.

== Audio/video ==
The Virtual Tranquilizer: Managing Adrenaline for Veterans Returning from Deployment [Audio] Springfield, IL: Illinois National Guard and Prevention First, 2008. Working with Emotional Clients: The Virtual Tranquilizer® for Lawyers [Video]. Chicago: American Bar Association: 2010.
