= Tibor Scitovsky =

American economist

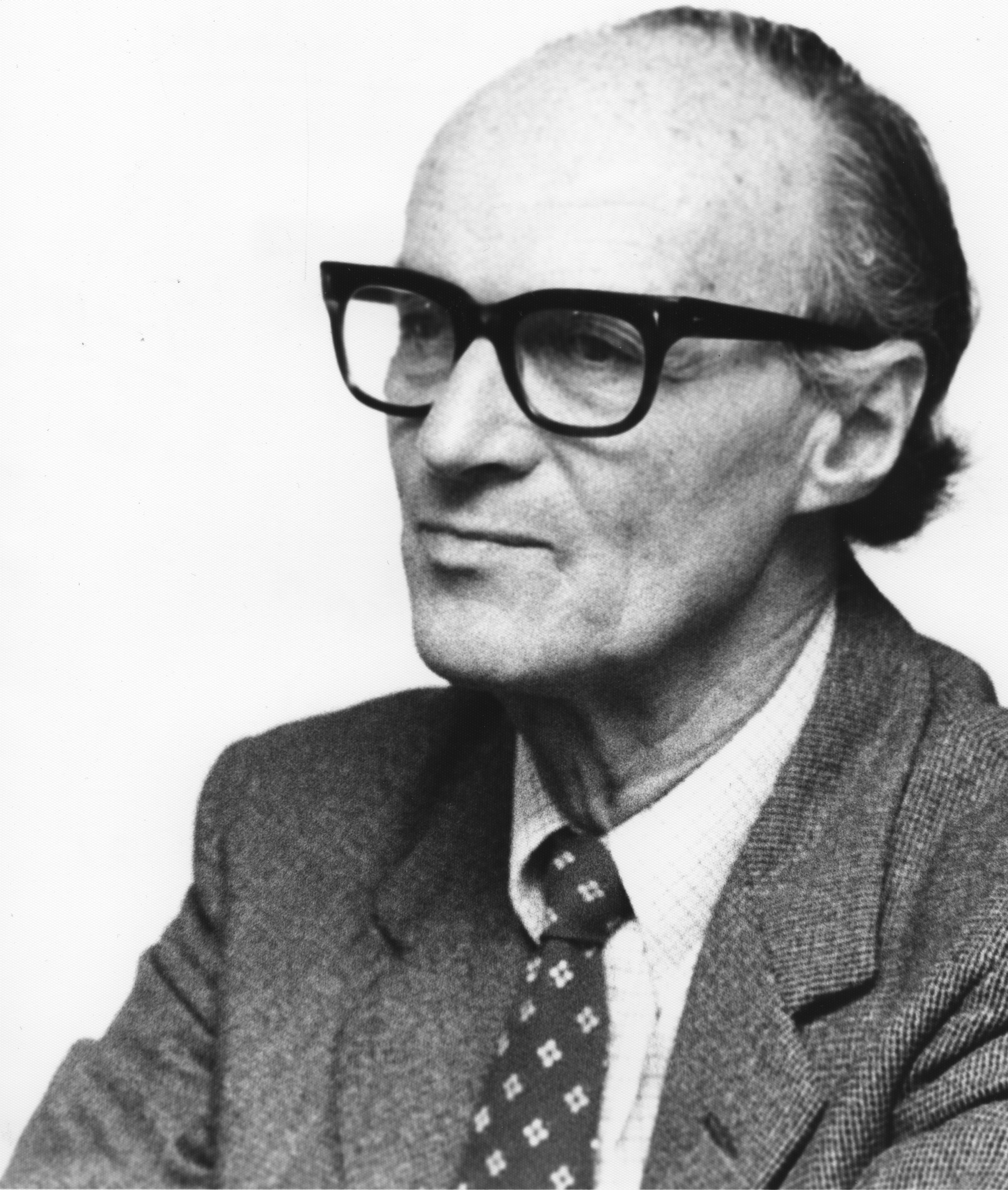
- Tibor Scitovsky, 1978
- Born: November 3, 1910; Budapest, Hungary
- Died: June 1, 2002 (aged 91); Stanford, California
- Citizenship: United States
- Education: University of Budapest; University of Cambridge; London School of Economics
- Spouse: Anne A. Scitovsky (divorced)
- Scientific career
- Fields: Economics
- Workplaces: Stanford University; University of California, Berkeley

Tibor de Scitovsky, also known as Tibor Scitovsky (November 3, 1910 – June 1, 2002), was a Hungarian-born, American economist best known for his writing on the nature of people's happiness in relation to consumption. He was an associate professor and professor of economics at Stanford University from 1946 through 1958 and an Eberle Professor of Economics from 1970 until his retirement in 1976, when he became professor emeritus. In honor of his deep contributions to economic analysis, he was elected Distinguished Fellow of the American Economic Association, member of the American Academy of Arts and Sciences, and Corresponding Fellow of the British Academy.

== Life ==
Scitovsky was born in Hungary in 1910. As the de indicates, he was born into a noble family; his father, Tibor Scitovszky, held the post of Foreign Minister. He studied at the Pázmány Péter University (from which he held an undergraduate degree in law), the University of Cambridge, and the London School of Economics. He came to the United States on a traveling fellowship and enlisted in the United States Army during World War II, in counter-intelligence. Because he still had family in German-allied Hungary, he changed his name during this time to Thomas Dennis.

After a spell at Stanford from 1946 to 1958, he left for the University of California, Berkeley and remained there until 1968, although he was on leave to do research at the Organisation for Economic Co-operation and Development.

Starting as early as 1959, he began an examination of the nature of human well-being from a broader viewpoint than is customary among economists.

Scitovsky married and later divorced health economist Anne A. Scitovsky.

== Major works ==
- Scitovsky, Tibor (1940), "A study of interest and capital", Economica.
- Scitovsky, Tibor (1941), "A note on welfare propositions in economics", RES.
- Scitovsky, Tibor (1941), "Capital accumulation, employment and price rigidity", RES.
- Scitovsky, Tibor (1942), "A reconsideration of the theory of tariffs", RES.
- Scitovsky, Tibor (1943), "A note on profit maximization and its implications", RES.
- Scitovsky, Tibor (1951), Welfare and competition: the economics of a fully employed economy.
- Scitovsky, Tibor; Shaw, E. S.; Tarshis, L. (1951), Mobilizing resources for war: the economic alternatives.
- Scitovsky, Tibor (1954), "Two concepts of external economies", JPE.
- Scitovsky, Tibor (1958), Economic theory and Western European integration.
- Scitovsky, Tibor (1959), "Growth, balanced or unbalanced?", in Abramovitz, Moses; et al. (eds.), The allocation of economic resources: essays in honor of Bernard Francis Haley, Stanford, California: Stanford University Press, OCLC 490147128.
- Scitovsky, Tibor (1960), "Standards for the performance of our economic system", AER.
- Scitovsky, Tibor (1962), "On the principle of consumer's sovereignty", AER.
- Scitovsky, Tibor (1964), Papers on welfare and growth.
- Scitovsky, Tibor (1969), Money and the balance of payments.
- Scitovsky, Tibor; Little, I. M. D.; Scott, M. F. G (1970), Industry and trade in some developing countries.
- Scitovsky, Tibor (1972), "What's wrong with the arts is what's wrong with society", AER.
- Scitovsky, Tibor (1972), "The producer society", De Economist.
- Scitovsky, Tibor (1973), "The place of economic welfare in human welfare", QREB.
- Scitovsky, Tibor (1974), "Inequalities: open and hidden, measured and immeasurable", Annals of AAPSS.
- Scitovsky, Tibor (1974), "Are men rational or economists wrong?", in Nations and Households in Economic Growth.
- Scitovsky, Tibor (1976), The joyless economy: an inquiry into human satisfaction and consumer dissatisfaction.
- Scitovsky, Tibor (1978), "Market power and inflation", Economica.
- Scitovsky, Tibor (1978), "Asymmetries in economics", Scottish Journal of Political Economy.
- Scitovsky, Tibor (1979), "Can changing consumer tastes save resources?", in Economic Growth and Resources.
- Scitovsky, Tibor (1980), "Can capitalism survive? An old question in a new setting", AER.
- Scitovsky, Tibor (1981), "Excess demand for job importance and its implications", in Wert und Praeferenzprobleme in den Sozialwissenschaften.
- Scitovsky, Tibor (1981), "The desire for excitement in modern society", Kyklos.
- Scitovsky, Tibor (1983), "Subsidies for the arts: the economic argument", in Economic support for the arts.
- Scitovsky, Tibor (1985), "Human desire and economic satisfaction", Kyklos.
- Scitovsky, Tibor (1986), "Psychologizing by economists", in MacFadyen, editors, Psychology.
- Scitovsky, Tibor (1986), Human desire and economic satisfaction: essays on the frontiers of economics.
- Scitovsky, Tibor (1987), "Growth in the affluent society", 1987, Lloyds BR.
